= Robert M. Thrall =

American mathematician

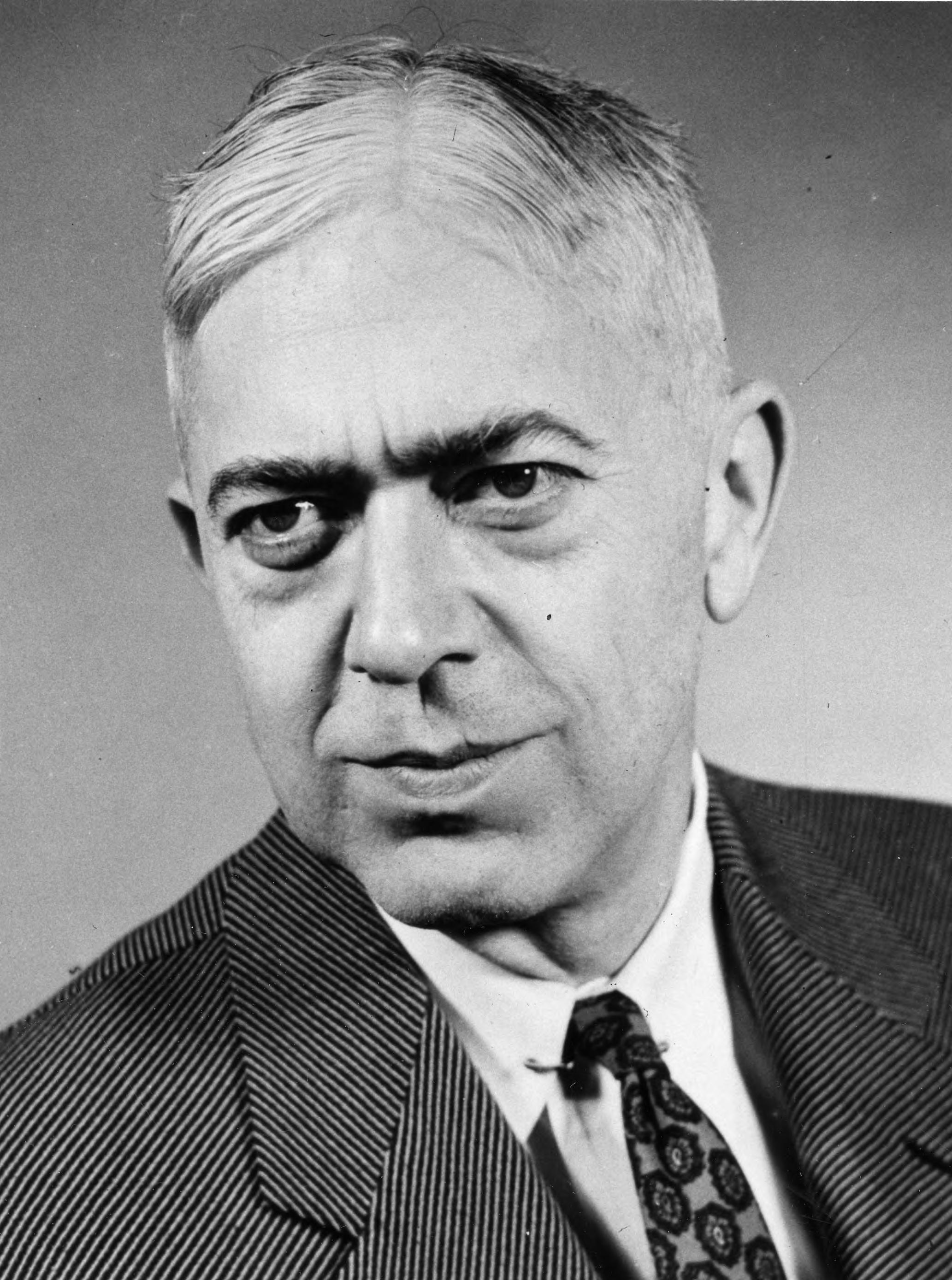
- Born: September 23, 1914
- Died: April 11, 2006 (aged 91); Philadelphia
- Education: Illinois College; University of Illinois
- Scientific career
- Fields: mathematics operations research
- Workplaces: University of Michigan; Rice University
- Thesis: Metabelian groups and trilinear forms
- Doctoral advisor: Henry Roy Brahana
- Doctoral students: Walter Feit; Gerald L. Thompson

Robert McDowell Thrall (1914–2006) was an American mathematician and a pioneer of operations research.

== Biography ==
Thrall graduated in 1935 with BA from Illinois College and in 1937 with MA and PhD in mathematics from the University of Illinois. From 1937 to 1969 he was a professor of mathematics at the University of Michigan in Ann Arbor. In 1969 he became a professor in the newly founded department of Mathematical Sciences at Rice University. He chaired the department from 1969 to 1974. In 1977 he received a joint appointment in Rice's newly established Graduate School of Business, where he taught decision analysis to MBA Students. He retired from Rice University as professor emeritus in 1984.

At the beginning of his career, Thrall's research was in group theory, ring theory, and representation theory. His research accomplishments during that period include the celebrated hooklength formula for the dimension of an irreducible representation of a symmetric group, or equivalently the number of standard Young tableaux of a given shape (with J. Sutherland Frame and G. de B. Robinson) and the influential Brauer-Thrall conjectures (with Richard Brauer).

For two years, from 1940 to 1942, he was a visiting scholar at the Institute for Advanced Study. During WW II he began to study operations research and development of mathematical models for military applications. From 1957 to 1961 he was the editor-in-chief of Management Science, as successor to C. West Churchman. From 1961 to 1965 Thrall was an associate editor for the journal. He was the 16th president of The Institute of Management Sciences (TIMS; now INFORMS) for a one-year term in 1969–1970. He was elected to the 2002 class of Fellows of the Institute for Operations Research and the Management Sciences. With William W. Cooper, Rajiv Banker, and other collaborators, he wrote a number of important papers on data envelopment analysis (DEA). Thrall was the author or co-author of over 100 articles in scholarly journals, as well as several books.

He married Natalie Hunter in 1936. His wife died in 2004. Upon his death he was survived by a daughter, two sons, three grandchildren, and three great-grandchildren.

== Selected publications ==
=== Articles ===
- Thrall, Robert M. (1938). "A note on numbers of the form $a^2 + \alpha b^2 + \beta c^2 + \alpha \beta d^2$". Bulletin of the American Mathematical Society. 44 (6): 404–408. doi:10.1090/S0002-9904-1938-06768-7. ISSN 0002-9904.
- Thrall, R. M. (1938). "Apolarity of trilinear forms and pencils of bilinear forms". Bulletin of the American Mathematical Society. 44 (10): 678–684. doi:10.1090/S0002-9904-1938-06841-3. ISSN 0002-9904.
- Thrall, Robert M. (1941). "A note on a theorem by Witt". Bulletin of the American Mathematical Society. 47 (4): 303–309. doi:10.1090/S0002-9904-1941-07447-1. ISSN 0002-9904.
- Thrall, R. M. (1948). "Some generalization of quasi-Frobenius algebras". Transactions of the American Mathematical Society. 64: 173. doi:10.1090/S0002-9947-1948-0026048-0.
- Thrall, R. M. (1951). "On the projective structure of a modular lattice". Proceedings of the American Mathematical Society. 2: 146. doi:10.1090/S0002-9939-1951-0041104-4.
- Motzkin, T. S.; Raiffa, H.; Thompson, G. L.; Thrall, R. M. (1953). "The double description method". Contributions to the theory of games. Annals of Mathematics Studies. Vol. 2. Princeton, N. J.: Princeton University Press. pp. 51–73. MR 0060202.
- Frame, J. S.; Robinson, G. de B.; Thrall, R. M. (1954). "The Hook Graphs of the Symmetric Group". Canadian Journal of Mathematics. 6: 316–324. doi:10.4153/CJM-1954-030-1. ISSN 0008-414X.
- Samelson, Hans; Thrall, R. M.; Wesler, Oscar (1958). "A partition theorem for Euclidean $n$-space". Proceedings of the American Mathematical Society. 9 (5): 805. doi:10.1090/S0002-9939-1958-0097025-0.
- Seiford, Lawrence M.; Thrall, Robert M. (1990). "Recent developments in DEA". Journal of Econometrics. 46 (1–2): 7–38. doi:10.1016/0304-4076(90)90045-U. ISSN 0304-4076.
- Banker, Rajiv D.; Thrall, R.M. (1992). "Estimation of returns to scale using data envelopment analysis". European Journal of Operational Research. 62 (1): 74–84. doi:10.1016/0377-2217(92)90178-C. ISSN 0377-2217.

=== Books ===
- Artin, Emil; Nesbitt, Cecil J.; Thrall, Robert M. (1944), Rings with Minimum Condition, University of Michigan Publications in Mathematics, vol. 1, Ann Arbor, Mich.: University of Michigan Press, MR 0010543
- Spivey, W. Allen; Thrall, Robert M. (1970). Linear optimization. New York: Holt, Rinehart and Winston. ISBN 0030841739. LCCN 70125474; xii+530 p.; illus.
- Thrall, Robert M.; Tornheim, Leonard (1 January 1970). Vector Spaces and Matrices. Courier Corporation. ISBN 978-0-486-62667-3. 1st edition. Wiley. 1957.
