= 2008 Canadian honours =

Canadian government recognitions

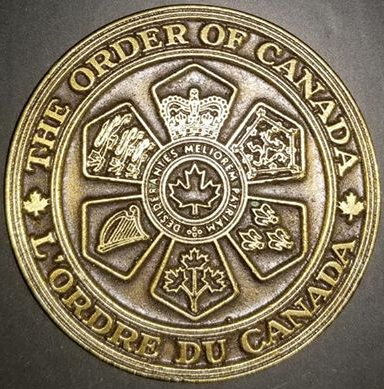
The Seal of the Order of Canada

The following are the appointments to various Canadian Honours of 2008. Usually, they are announced as part of the New Year and Canada Day celebrations and are published within the Canada Gazette during the year. This follows the custom set out within the United Kingdom which publishes its appoints of various British Honours for New Year's and for monarch's official birthday. However, instead of the midyear appointments announced on Victoria Day, the official birthday of the Canadian Monarch, this custom has been transferred with the celebration of Canadian Confederation and the creation of the Order of Canada.

However, as the Canada Gazette publishes appointment to various orders, decorations and medal, either Canadian or from Commonwealth and foreign states, this article will reference all Canadians so honoured during the 2008 calendar year.

Provincial Honours are not listed within the Canada Gazette. However, they are listed here.

== The Order of Canada ==
=== Companion of the Order of Canada ===
Undress ribbon of a Companion of the Order of Canada

- The Right Honourable Joseph Jacques Jean Chrétien, PC, CC, QC
- Prudy Crawford, CC - This is a promotion within the Order
- The Honourable Barnett J. Danson, PC, CC - This is a promotion within the Order
- Rock Demers, CC - This is a promotion within the Order
- The Honourable Charles D. Gonthier, CC
- The Honourable Frank Iacobucci, CC
- Preston Manning, CC
- The Honourable Louise Arbour, CC
- Michael Snow, CC - This is a promotion within the Order
- Margaret E. Southern, CC, LVO, AEO - This is a promotion within the Order
- The Right Honourable Kim Campbell, P.C., C.C.
- The Honourable John C. Major, C.C.
- G. Wallace F. McCain, C.C., O.N.B. - This is a promotion within the Order
- Raymond Moriyama, C.C., O.Ont. - This is a promotion within the Order
- Marcel Trudel, C.C., G.O.Q. - This is a promotion within the Order

=== Honorary Officers of the Order of Canada ===
- Charles Aznavour, O.C.
- Bernard Pivot, O.C.

=== Officer of the Order of Canada ===
Undress ribbon of an Officer of the Order of Canada

- Bertha Clark, OC
- Tom Cochrane, OC
- Paul Corkum, OC
- The Honourable William Hoyt, OC
- Molly Johnson, OC
- Leon Katz, OC, O.Ont
- Edward A. Lyons, OC
- Michael Maclear, OC
- Alistair MacLeod, OC
- Carolyn McAskie, OC
- Derek Oland, OC
- Miles Richardson, OC
- Robbie Robertson, OC
- Ginette Lemire Rodger, OC
- Jane Stewart, OC
- Pamela Wallin, OC, SOM
- Kenny Wheeler, OC
- Marie Chiouinard, OC
- David A. Dodge, OC
- Richard L. (Rick) George, OC
- Deborah Grey, OC
- Clara Hughes, OC, O.Man
- Douglas Gordon Jones, OC
- The Honourable E. Leo Kolber, OC
- Donat Lacroix, OC
- Jean Lemire, OC
- Joanne McDonald, OC, ONL
- Grant Munro, OC
- Stephen Nash, OC, OBC
- Alex Neve, OC
- Adrianne Pieczonka, OC
- Richard Puddephatt, OC
- Muriel Smith, OC
- Steven Staryk, OC
- Lawrence M. Tanebaum, OC
- Jeff Wall, OC
- Jocelyne Alloucherie, O.C.
- Gail Asper, O.C., O.M.
- Randolph C. (Randy) Bachman, O.C., O.M.
- Robin W. Boadway, O.C.
- Raymond Breton, O.C.
- AA Bronson, O.C.
- Victor S. Buffalo, O.C., A.O.E.
- Maria Campbell, O.C., S.O.M.
- Joan Clark, O.C.
- George Elliott Clarke, O.C., O.N.S.
- Jean-Marie Dufour, O.C., O.Q.
- Basil (Buzz) Hargrove, O.C.
- Martha Jodrey, O.C.
- The Honourable Donald J. Johnston, P.C., O.C.
- Victor Ling, O.C., O.B.C.
- Peter Mansbridge, O.C.
- Allan P. Markin, O.C.
- Piers McDonald, O.C.
- The Honourable Frank McKenna, P.C., O.C., O.N.B.
- Timothy R. Oke, O.C.
- The Honourable Landon Pearson, O.C.
- Clayton H. Riddell, O.C.
- John N. Smith, O.C.
- David Sweet, O.C.
- Audrey Thomas, O.C.
- Paul Thompson, O.C.

=== Members of the Order of Canada ===
Undress ribbon for a Member of the Order of Canada

- Jean-Baptiste (John) Arcand, C.M.
- Chrystine Brouillet, C.M.
- Elizabeth (Libby) Burnham, C.M.
- Jean C. Chiasson, C.M.
- Joan Craig, C.M.
- Alexander (Al) Davidson, C.M.
- Mary Dawson, C.M.
- Flora M. Dell, C.M.
- Robert Doyle, C.M.
- Maria K. Eriksen, C.M.
- John Fanning, C.M.
- Bunny Ferguson, C.M.
- William Fitzgerald, C.M.
- J. Barry French, C.M.
- Ronald Gillespie, C.M.
- Terrence Gillespie, C.M.
- Muriel Gold, C.M.
- Charlotte Gray, C.M.
- Doreen Hall, C.M.
- Robert H. A. Haslam, C.M.
- The Honourable Lynda Haverstock, C.M., S.O.M.
- The Reverend Dr. Brent Hawkes, C.M.
- Peter A. Howlett, C.M.
- Beryl Ivey, C.M.
- Zbigniew Kabata, C.M.
- Laurent Lapierre, C.M.
- Ronald Edward Lawless, C.M.
- Jon Lien, C.M.
- P. Ann MacCuspie, C.M.
- Douglas MacPhee, C.M.
- Robert R. McEwen, C.M.
- Thomas W. Noseworthy, C.M.
- Elizabeth Parr-Johnston, C.M.
- Jean E. Portugal, C.M.
- Lola Rasminsky, C.M.
- Donald B. Rix, C.M., O.B.C.
- Leon Rooke, C.M.
- Kent Stetson, C.M.
- Jeffrey Turnbull, C.M.
- Jim Vallance, C.M.
- H. P. Daniel (Sandy) Van Ginkel, C.M.
- Timothy Vernon, C.M.
- Frederick A. (Fred) Walsh, C.M.
- Michael R. Weir, C.M., O.Ont.
- Howard White, C.M., O.B.C.
- Wilfrid Wilkinson, C.M.
- Clara Will, C.M.
- Garry W. Anderson, C.M.
- Tony Aspler, C.M.
- Peter Aucoin, C.M.
- Larry Audlaluk, C.M.
- John Barron, C.M.
- Margaret Becklake, C.M.
- Carol Gay Bell, C.M., S.O.M.
- Hélène-Andrée Bizier, C.M.
- Thea Borlase, C.M.
- Peter G. Buckland, C.M.
- Michael Clague, C.M.
- Armand de Mestral, C.M.
- Marcien Ferland, C.M.
- Mallory Gilbert, C.M.
- Frieda Granot, C.M.
- Walter Gretzky, C.M., O.Ont.
- Valerie Hussey, C.M.
- John E. (Jack) Irving, C.M.
- Antoine Landry, C.M.
- The Honourable Patrick LeSage, C.M.
- Karen Letofsky, C.M.
- The Honourable René J. Marin, C.M., O.M.M., O.Ont., C.D.
- Richard Parsons (Dick) North, C.M.
- Patricia O'Connor, C.M.
- Irene E. Pfeiffer, C.M.
- Kenneth Poyser, C.M.
- Derek A. Price, C.M.
- Bruce Pullan, C.M.
- Ray V. Rajotte, C.M., A.O.E., M.S.M.
- Joseph Schatzker, C.M.
- Michael D. Scott, C.M.
- Yoshio Senda, C.M.
- Paul Shaffer, C.M.
- Douglas A. Smith, C.M.
- Sister Margaret Smith, C.M.
- Jeffrey Spalding, C.M.
- T. Kenneth Thorlakson, C.M.
- Sister Margaret Vickers, C.M.
- Anne H. Wieler, C.M.
- Richard B. Wright, C.M.
- Gordon E. Arnell, C.M.
- Constance Backhouse, C.M.
- Lyle R. Best, C.M.
- Paul Bley, C.M.
- Peter Boneham, C.M.
- Yvette Bonny, C.M., C.Q.
- Jeanne-d'Arc Bouchard, C.M., C.Q.
- Robert E. Brown, C.M., O.Q.
- Judith Chernin Budovitch, C.M.
- Dominic Champagne, C.M.
- Simon Chang, C.M.
- Marcel A. Desautels, C.M.
- The Honourable Myra A. Freeman, C.M., O.N.S.
- Robert G. Glossop, C.M.
- Vladimir Hachinski, C.M.
- Dezso J. Horvath, C.M.
- Elke Inkster, C.M.
- Tim Inkster, C.M.
- Patrick J. Keenan, C.M., O.Ont.
- Marc Kielburger, C.M.
- Rudolph J. Kriegler, C.M.
- Norman Levine, C.M.
- Christine Leyser, C.M.
- H. Wade MacLauchlan, C.M.
- R. Gordon M. Macpherson, C.M.
- Mick Mallon, C.M.
- Judith Mappin, C.M.
- Michael R. Marrus, C.M.
- Ian W. McDougall, C.M.
- Axel Meisen, C.M.
- Henry Morgentaler, C.M.
- Philip Walter Owen, C.M.
- André Poilièvre, C.M.
- The Honourable Brenda Robertson, C.M., O.N.B.
- Kenneth Charles Sauer, C.M., C.D.
- Bernard Savoie, C.M.
- Reginald Lorne Scott, C.M.
- T. Clayton Shields, C.M.
- John S. Speakman, C.M.
- James C. Temerty, C.M.
- José Verstappen, C.M.
- Henry H. Wakabayashi, C.M., O.B.C.
- George A. Zarb, C.M.

== Order of Military Merit ==
=== Commanders of the Order of Military Merit ===
Undress ribbon for a Commander of the Order of Military Merit

- Major-General D. W. Langton, C.D.
- Lieutenant-General Andrew Brooke Leslie, M.S.C., M.S.M., C.D. - This is a promotion within the Order
- Major-General J. G. M. Lessard, C.D.
- Rear-Admiral Tyrone H. W. Pile, C.D.
- Vice-Admiral Drew William Robertson, M.S.M., C.D. - This is a promotion within the Order
- Major-General W. Angus Watt, C.D. - This is a promotion within the Order
- Major-General S. A. Beare, C.M.M., M.S.M., C.D.
- Major-General D. J. R. S. Benjamin, C.M.M., C.D. - This is a promotion within the Order
- Major-General J. M. Duval, C.M.M., C.D
- Major-General J. P. Y. D. Gosselin, C.M.M., C.D. - This is a promotion within the Order
- Rear-Admiral P. D. McFadden, C.M.M., C.D.
- Rear-Admiral B. M. Weadon, C.M.M., C.D

=== Officers of the Order of Military Merit ===
Undress ribbon for an Officer of the Order of Military Merit

- Colonel Jonathan Keith Ambler, C.D.
- Colonel Yvan Joseph Aime Jean Blondin, C.D.
- Commander David Ross Garbutt Brown, C.D.
- Colonel R. K. (Ken) Chadder, C.D.
- Major Frances Louise Chilton-Mackay, C.D.
- Major Frederick Wayne Cyr, C.D.
- Lieutenant-Colonel Joseph Paul de Boucherville Taillon, C.D.
- Lieutenant-Colonel Brigid White Dooley-Tremblay, C.D.
- Lieutenant-Colonel Richard Bruce Fawcett, C.D.
- Captain(N) David Christopher Gardam, C.D.
- Major Lloyd William Arthur Gillam, C.D.
- Captain(N) Laurence M. Hickey, C.D.
- Colonel Douglas Craig Hilton, C.D.
- Colonel Joseph Jacques Aubert Lachance, C.D.
- Colonel Joseph Rene Marcel Guy Laroche, C.D.
- Colonel Tom James Lawson, C.D.
- Major J. M. A. Levesque, C.D.
- Captain(N) Paul Andrew Maddison, C.D.
- Commander John Frederick Newton, C.D.
- Lieutenant-Colonel Paul Ormsby, C.D.
- Lieutenant-Colonel Jean-Pierre Pichette, C.D.
- Major Lee-Anne Quinn, C.D.
- Commander John Allen Roche, C.D.
- Lieutenant-Colonel Stéphane Roy, C.D.
- Colonel Clyde Thomas Russell, C.D.
- Colonel Grant Yorkland Smith, C.D.
- Colonel Gary Reginald Stafford, C.D.
- Lieutenant-Colonel Edward Emil Staniowski, C.D.
- Colonel Denis Thompson, C.D.
- Captain(N) Kelly Edward Williams, M.S.M., C.D.
- Colonel Paul Francis Wynnyk, C.D.
- Colonel Lorne David Zens, C.D.
- Lieutenant-Colonel Susan Beharriell, O.M.M., C.D.
- Captain (N) S. C. Bertrand, O.M.M, C.D.
- Colonel D. C. Burt, O.M.M., C.D.
- Lieutenant-Colonel S. M. Carey, O.M.M., C.D.
- Colonel G. J. A. Champagne, O.M.M., C.D.
- Lieutenant-Colonel B. A. J. Ciarroni, O.M.M., C.D.
- Commander D. J. M. Daigneault, O.M.M., C.D.
- Colonel J. R. Ferron, O.M.M., C.D.
- Lieutenant-Colonel M. J. P. Fortin, O.M.M., C.D.
- Lieutenant-Colonel P. F. C. Garbutt, O.M.M., C.D.
- Lieutenant-Colonel W. H. Garrick, O.M.M., C.D.
- Colonel L. G. Gillis, O.M.M., C.D.
- Commander M. J. M. Hallé, O.M.M., C.D
- Lieutenant-Colonel J. W. Hammond, O.M.M., C.D.
- Major D. L. Harper, O.M.M., C.D.
- Captain (N) H. T. Harsch, O.M.M., C.D.
- Captain (N) G. H. A. Hatton, O.M.M., C.D.
- Captain (N) N. H. Jolin, O.M.M., C.D.
- Commander R. W. Jones, O.M.M., C.D.
- Lieutenant-Colonel P. E. Kearney, O.M.M., C.D.
- Lieutenant-Colonel T. W. Kopan, O.M.M., M.O.M., C.D.
- Lieutenant-Colonel J. N. Lalonde, O.M.M., C.D.
- Lieutenant-Colonel R. S. Martinell, O.M.M., C.D.
- Lieutenant-Colonel D. A. Mason, O.M.M., C.D.
- Lieutenant-Colonel D. L. Miller, O.M.M., C.D.
- Colonel D. G. Neasmith, O.M.M., C.D.
- Colonel A. C. Patch, O.M.M., C.D.
- Lieutenant-Colonel R. J. Powell, O.M.M., C.D.
- Colonel J. B. Roeterink, O.M.M., C.D.
- Lieutenant-Colonel D. A. Rundle, O.M.M., C.D.
- Colonel J. G. G. Simard, O.M.M., C.D.
- Captain (N) W. S. Truelove, O.M.M., C. D.

=== Members of the Order of Military Merit ===
Undress ribbon for a Member of the Order of Military Merit

- Petty Officer 1st Class Jean Joseph Gabriel Adrien Allard, C.D.
- Chief Petty Officer 2nd Class Muriel Marie Jeanne Arsenault, C.D.
- Chief Warrant Officer Joseph Théophile Richard Bégin, C.D.
- Chief Warrant Officer Jean Boivin, C.D.
- Warrant Officer Andre Joseph Luc Bouchard, C.D.
- Captain Jacques Albert Gaetan Joseph Bouchard, C.D.
- Captain Martin Lewis Brown, C.D.
- Master Warrant Officer John Gerald Bucci, C.D.
- Master Warrant Officer James Donald Butters, C.D.
- Lieutenant(N) Robert Francis Cyril Campbell, C.D.
- Chief Warrant Officer Kevin Ernest Carleton, C.D.
- Chief Warrant Officer J. René Caron, C.D.
- Chief Warrant Officer Marjolaine Marie Caron, C.D.
- Master Warrant Officer Joseph Maurice Gabriel Chartier, C.D.
- Chief Warrant Officer Henry Jacob Chartrand, C.D.
- Chief Petty Officer 1st Class Barbara Jean Corbett, C.D.
- Chief Warrant Officer Marc Joseph Corbin, C.D.
- Chief Petty Officer 1st Class Richard (Rick) James Devlieger, C.D.
- Warrant Officer Michael Richard Dickerson, C.D.
- Chief Warrant Officer Garfield (Gary) Augustine Foley, C.D.
- Master Warrant Officer Toni Kendall Gilks, C.D.
- Master Warrant Officer Joseph Laurent Daniel Giroux, C.D.
- Captain Brian John Greenwood, C.D.
- Chief Warrant Officer Kent John Griffiths, C.D.
- Master Warrant Officer Geoffrey Ernest Hanson, C.D.
- Master Warrant Officer David Charles Herman, C.D.
- Master Warrant Officer Donald Bruce Hodge, C.D.
- Chief Warrant Officer Lloyd Robert Hodgins, C.D.
- Chief Warrant Officer Michael Robert Eldon Hornbrook, C.D.
- Warrant Officer Marilyn Barbara Hynes, C.D
- Chief Petty Officer 1st Class Normand Fernand Joseph Laliberté, C.D.
- Chief Warrant Officer Joseph Robert Yves Lefebvre, C.D.
- Sergeant Susan Marie Lloyd, C.D.
- Chief Warrant Officer Dino Luberti, C.D.
- Chief Warrant Officer Kevin Mason, C.D.
- Master Warrant Officer A. Gerard McGee, C.D.
- Master Warrant Officer Todd Alan McGowan, C.D.
- Chief Warrant Officer Raymond Anthony McInnis, C.D.
- Chief Petty Officer 1st Class Dennis Rae McMillan, C.D.
- Chief Warrant Officer J. H. Bernard McNicoll, C.D.
- Master Warrant Officer Robert Joseph Montague, C.D.
- Captain William David Moore, C.D.
- Master Warrant Officer Leonard Paul O'Brien, C.D.
- Chief Warrant Officer Kevin Douglas O'Rourke, C.D.
- Master Warrant Officer John Paul Michael Parsons, C.D.
- Master Warrant Officer Jocelyn Elaine Pemberton, C.D.
- Chief Warrant Officer J. G. Gilbert Poirier, C.D.
- Master Warrant Officer Timothy Patrick Power, C.D.
- Chief Warrant Officer Kenneth Lauder Rerrie, C.D.
- Master Warrant Officer Terrence Lincoln Riddle, C.D.
- Master Warrant Officer Marc-André Ross, C.D.
- Master Warrant Officer Yves Roy, C.D.
- Chief Warrant Officer Bruno Joseph Ernest Savard, C.D.
- Chief Warrant Officer Craig Albert Schrader, C.D.
- Petty Officer 1st Class William Edward Slater, C.D.
- Master Warrant Officer Susan Bertha Stark, C.D.
- Chief Warrant Officer Pierre Ste-Marie, C.D.
- Lieutenant W. J. Anderson, M.M.M., C.D.
- Chief Warrant Officer M. L. Baisley, M.M.M., C.D
- Chief Warrant Officer C. J. Barth, M.M.M., C.D
- Chief Warrant Officer J. R. S. Beaudoin, M.M.M., C.D.
- Master Warrant Officer B. R. J. Beek, M.M.M., C.D.
- Chief Warrant Officer A. J. W. Begg, M.M.M., C.D.
- Chief Warrant Officer J. M. A. Brideau, M.M.M., C.D.
- Captain T. D. Brodie, M. M. M., C.D.
- Master Warrant Officer J. J. R. Butler, M.M.M., M.S.M., C.D.
- Master Warrant Officer M. Cantin, M.M.M., C.D.
- Chief Warrant Officer J. Y. P. Cassavant, M.M.M., C.D.
- Warrant Officer R. C. Cosens, M.M.M., C.D.
- Chief Warrant Officer J. G. P. Côté, M.M.M., C.D.
- Warrant Officer M. N. M. Cowperthwaite, M.M.M., C.D.
- Warrant Officer R. R. G. Cranford, M.M.M., C.D.
- Master Warrant Officer A. M. Cromwell, M.M.M., C.D.
- Warrant Officer M. C. D. L. Deshaies, M.M.M., C.D.
- Master Warrant Officer J. M. Doppler, M.M.M., C.D.
- Chief Petty Officer 1st Class H. W. Fancy, M.M.M., C.D.
- Sergeant T. A. Flath, M.M.M., C.D.
- Chief Warrant Officer G. K. Gagawchuk, M.M.M., C.D.
- Chief Warrant Officer J. A. Guimond, M.M.M., C.D.
- Petty Officer 2nd Class J. P. Haas, M.M.M., C.D.
- Chief Petty Officer 1st Class P. M. Hagan, M.M.M., C.D. L
- Chief Petty Officer 2nd Class T. E. Harwood-Jones, M.M.M., C.D.
- Chief Warrant Officer J. K. Hohmann, M.M.M., C.D.
- Master Warrant Officer T. A. Innes, M.M.M., C.D.
- Private O. Ittinuar, M. M. M., C.D.
- Chief Warrant Officer G. J. R. P. Janssens, M.M.M., C.D.
- Petty Officer 1st Class S. W. Jeffery, M.M.M., C.D.
- Lieutenant (N) P. M. A. Jessup, M.M.M., C.D.
- Chief Warrant Officer K. P. Jones, M.M.M., C.D.
- Chief Warrant Officer K. R. Junor, M.M.M., C.D.
- Master Warrant Officer L. T. King, M.M.M., C.D.
- Chief Warrant Officer C. J. E. Kitching, M.M.M., C.D.
- Warrant Officer J. G. Lamarre, M.M.M., C.D.
- Chief Petty Officer 1st Class J. A. C. Laurendeau, M.M.M., C.D.
- Petty Officer 1st Class J. A. Llewellen, M.M.M., C.D.
- Captain B. E. Maddin, M.M.M., C.D.
- Chief Petty Officer 1st Class D. A. Markin, M.M.M., C.D.
- Warrant Officer D. G. Marshall, M.M.M., C.D.
- Chief Warrant Officer J. J. G. Martin, M.M.M., C.D.
- Chief Warrant Officer D. J. Mazerolle, M.M.M., C.D.
- Sergeant C. A. McLean, M.M.M., C.D.
- Sergeant R. H. Mitchell, M.M.M., C.D.
- Chief Petty Officer 1st Class M. E. Moger, M.M.M., C.D.
- Chief Warrant Officer G. W. F. Morrison, M.M.M., C.D.
- Chief Petty Officer 2nd Class J. F. Murphy, M.M.M., C.D.
- Chief Warrant Officer J. E. O. Myers, M.M.M., C.D.
- Chief Warrant Officer B. G. Paradis, M.M.M., C.D.
- Chief Warrant Officer J. B. J. P. Pépin, M.M.M., C.D.
- Master Warrant Officer J. W. Peterson, M.M.M., C.D.
- Master Warrant Officer J. H. Pineault, M.M.M., C.D.
- Master Warrant Officer A. Renaud, M.M.M., C.D.
- Chief Warrant Officer J. E. R. Riopel, M.M.M., C.D.
- Master Warrant Officer T. G. Roberts, M.M.M., C.D.
- Captain R. J. A. Robillard, M.M.M., C.D.
- Chief Petty Officer 2nd Class A. B. Robinson, M.M.M., C.D.
- Captain T. J. E. Robinson, M.M.M., C.D .
- Chief Warrant Officer J. M. Y. Rochon, M.M.M., C.D.
- Chief Warrant Officer J. L. Scheidl, M.M.M., C.D.
- Chief Petty Officer 2nd Class M. P. Simonsen, M.M.M., C.D.
- Master Warrant Officer G. J. M. Tanney, M.M.M., C.D.
- Major G. W. A. Thorne, M.M.M., C.D.
- Chief Warrant Officer D. V. Tibbel, M.M.M., C.D.
- Captain R. Van den Berg, M.M.M., C.D
- Master Warrant Officer M. P. Webb, M.M.M., C.D.
- Chief Warrant Officer C. A. White, M.M.M., C.D.

== Order of Merit of the Police Forces ==
=== Commanders of the Order of Merit of the Police Forces ===
Undress ribbon of a Commander of the Order of Merit of the Police Forces

- Detective Sergeant Tony Cannavino
- Chief Jack Ewatski, C.O.M. Chef Jack Ewatski, C.O.M.
- Chief Edgar A. MacLeod, C.O.M. - This is a promotion within the Order

=== Officers of the Order of Merit of the Police Forces ===
Undress ribbon of an Officer of the Order of Merit of the Police Forces

- Chief William Sterling Blair
- Assistant Director Diane Bourdeau
- Deputy Chief Constable James S. Chu
- Chief William J. Closs
- Assistant Commissioner Sandra Mae Marie Conlin
- Constable Jean-Guy Dagenais
- Director Yvan Delorme
- Assistant Director Jean-Guy Gagnon
- Assistant Commissioner Howard Darrell Martin Madill
- Assistant Commissioner Michael F. McDonell
- Chief Superintendent Randy Starrett Robar
- Deputy Chief Anthony John Warr
- Deputy Chief Clive L. Weighill
- Senior Director Eldon Amoroso, O.O.M.
- Chief Jack H. Beaton, O.O.M.
- Deputy Chief Kim Walter Derry, O.O.M.
- Chief Constable Derek C. Egan, O.O.M., C.D.
- Assistant Director General Régis Falardeau, O.O.M.
- Chief Wm. Murray Faulkner, O.O.M.
- Assistant Commissioner Peter M. German, O.O.M.
- Assistant Commissioner Darrell John LaFosse, O.O.M., L.V.O.
- Superintendent Gordon Blake Schumacher, O.O.M.
- Assistant Commissioner Joseph Donat Michel Seguin, O.O.M.
- Assistant Commissioner Raf Souccar, O.O.M.

=== Members of the Order of Merit of the Police Forces ===
Undress ribbon of a Member of the Order of Merit of the Police Forces

- Inspector Donald John Adam
- Sergeant Brenton Robert Baulkham
- Corporal Michel Bérubé
- Chief Allen G. Bodechon
- Chief Joseph F. Browne
- Inspector Myles F. Burke
- Assistant Director Yves Charette
- Corporal Thomas David Clark
- Constable Edward P. Conway
- Chief Ian Davidson
- Superintendent P. J. Keith Duggan
- Constable Ralph E. Edwards
- Sergeant Major Robert Gordon James Gallup
- Staff Sergeant Warren L. Games
- Staff Superintendent Richard J. Gauthier
- Staff Superintendent Gary Frank Grant
- Staff Sergeant Sylvio Alfred Gravel
- Inspector Charles Patrick Green
- Deputy Chief Troy C. Hagen
- Deputy Chief Bruce Kenneth Herridge
- Deputy Chief D. Eric Jolliffe
- Staff Sergeant Kathleen Ann King
- Detective Sergeant Derrick John Klassen
- Inspector Terry Wayne Kopan
- Constable Claude Larocque
- Louise Christina Logue
- Chief Superintendent Patrick F. McCloskey
- Superintendent Gordon Christopher McRae
- Staff Sergeant Robert Wayne Meredith
- Detective Sergeant Kenneth S. Molloy
- Sergeant Hugh Robert Muir
- Chief Brian Mullan
- Staff Sergeant Lawren Andrew Nause
- Inspector Brian Robert Pitman
- Sergeant Deborah June Pond
- Constable Lesley-Jane Ripley
- Glenwood L. Selig
- Chief Lorne W. Smith
- Staff Sergeant David Raymond Tipple
- Inspector Robert John Williams
- Inspector David Gerard Wojcik
- Chief Constable Walter Lorne Zapotichny
- Corporal Stewart Richard Angus, M.O.M.
- Corporal Terrence Barter, M.O.M.
- Sergeant James Raymond Baskin, M.O.M.
- Chief Superintendent Ross A. Bingley, M.O.M.
- Sergeant Major Randall Kent Burt, M.O.M.
- Superintendent Kenneth Cenzura, M.O.M.
- Superintendent Robert James Chapman, M.M.M., M.O.M., C.D.
- Director Serge Daoust, M.O.M.
- Chief Bruce J. Davis, M.O.M.
- Deputy Chief Jane Elizabeth Dick, M.O.M.
- Deputy Chief Bradley S. Duncan, M.O.M.
- Assistant Director General Denis Fiset, M.O.M.
- Deputy Chief Keith Livingstone Forde, M.O.M.
- Constable Robert Gagnon, M.O.M.
- Inspector John E. G. Grant, M.O.M.
- Chief Superintendent William B. Grodzinski, M.O.M.
- Sergeant Bradley Thomas Hampson, M.O.M.
- Chief Superintendent Barry Harvie, M.O.M.
- Inspector Shawn W. Hayes, M.O.M.
- Staff Sergeant Kenneth J. Hykawy, M.O.M.
- Chief Richard Laperriere, M.O.M.
- Staff Sergeant Gary John Le Gresley, M.O.M.
- Deputy Chief Constable Douglas A. LePard, M.O.M.
- Chief Glenn M. Lickers, M.O.M.
- Sergeant Douglas James Lockhart, M.O.M.
- Sergeant Gordon Bruce Magee, M.O.M.
- Chief Superintendent Norman Georges Mazerolle, M.O.M.
- Chief Gerald William McEwin, M.O.M.
- Chief Dale R. McFee, M.O.M.
- Staff Sergeant David Frederick McIntyre, M.O.M.
- Deputy Chief Charles David Mercier, M.O.M.
- Sergeant Sharon Meredith, M.O.M.
- Inspector Gervais Ouellet, M.O.M.
- Chief Superintendent Randall Ross Parks, M.O.M.
- Deputy Chief Constable Clayton J. D. Pecknold, M.O.M.
- Deputy Chief Constable Robert A. Rich, M.O.M.
- Superintendent Wayne Eric Rideout, M.O.M.
- Sergeant Robert A. Ruiters, M.O.M.
- Chief Constable Paul J. Shrive, M.O.M.
- Staff Sergeant Francis Ronald Stevenson, M.O.M.
- Constable Pierre Thébault, M.O.M.
- Georges D. Thériault, M.O.M.
- Chief Paul Russell Trivett, M.O.M.
- Associate Chief David D. Wilson, M.O.M.

== Most Venerable Order of the Hospital of St. John of Jerusalem ==
Undress ribbon for all grades of the Most Venerable Order of the Hospital of St. John of Jerusalem

=== Knights and Dames of the Order of St. John ===
- The Honourable David Charles Onley, O.Ont.
- The Honourable Steven L. Point
- Agnes Daniell, ADC
- Claude Gagnon

=== Commanders of the Order of St. John ===
- Debra E. Allcock
- Robert M. Boyko
- Major Roman John Ciecwierz, C.D.
- Captain William Gary Cullum, C.D., (Retired)
- Colonel Leslie Keith Deane, C.D.
- Luc Desmarais
- Lawrence R. Hardy

=== Officers of the Order of St. John ===
- Her Honour Ruth Ann Onley
- Her Honour Gwendolyn Point
- Joseph-Hyacinthe Breton
- Alexandra Carter
- Donna Christine Chandler
- Lise Dutrisac-Dillabough
- Reginald T. Erickson
- Commissioner Julian Fantino, C.O.M., O.Ont.
- Henry X. Geldart
- William W. Green, C.D.
- Melvin George Hazlewood
- Chief Petty Officer 2nd Class Charles Evert Hurst, C.D.
- Kit-Yee Lo, Scarborough
- Alan C. McBride
- Claudine Morisseau

=== Members of the Order of St. John ===
- Harry Abbink
- Robyn Ashby
- Brian G. C. Attfield
- Captaine Peter Beatty
- Lucie Bhérer
- Daniel Arthur Birkenbergs
- Alan Thomas Blundell
- Christopher Bolestrisge,
- Deputy ChiefTerence Edward Peter
- Lieutenant-Commander Ernest Joseph Bremner, C.D.
- Major Kenneth Wade Bridges
- Jennifer M. Carty
- Laurence Cheng
- Sergeant Bohdan Cherniawski
- Christopher Cheung
- Mark S. Conliffe
- ChiefPeter Corfield
- Robert Côté
- Todd Eric Harwood-Jones
- Kate Thurston Heron
- Audrey F. Hill
- Michael James Hill
- Edward David Hodgins
- Dany Houde
- Dominic Jobin-Cotnoir
- Audrey Helen Jones
- Janice Marjorie Kivimaki
- Audrey Lalonde
- Pierre Laplante
- Jean-Phillippe Lebel
- Captain Francis Lévesque
- Sub-lieutenant Sean Edward Livingston
- Corporal Graham Carl MacRae
- Daniel Michaud
- Ian Hugh Miller
- Laurie Ann Molnar
- Tara Morgan
- Captain Craig Michael Murray, C.D.
- Bradley A. Nastiuk
- Lieutenant(N) Brenda Louise Nelson, ADC
- Susanne Clara Maria Olver
- Renee Anthony Ongcango

== Provincial Honours ==
=== National Order of Québec ===
==== Grand Officers of the National Order of Québec ====
Undress ribbon for a Grand Officer of the National Order of Québec

- The Honourable Lucien Bouchard, PC, GOQ
- Robert Bourassa, GOQ
- Leonard Cohen, CC, GOQ
- Alban D'Amours, GOQ
- Daniel Johnson (Fils), GOQ
- Dr. Pierre Marc Johnson, GOQ, MD
- Bernard Landry, GOQ
- René Lévesque, GOQ
- Dr. Jacques Parizeau, GOQ, PH.D

==== Officers of the National Order of Québec ====
Undress ribbon for an Officer of the National Order of Québec

- André Bachand, CM, OQ
- Gérald-A. Beaudoin, OC, OQ
- Michel G. Bergeron, OQ
- Pierre Bruneau, OQ
- André Caillé, OQ
- Robert Charlebois, OQ
- Francine Décary, OQ
- Clément Duhaime, OQ
- Louis Fortier, OC, OQ
- Pavel Hamet, OQ
- Pierre Lassonde, CM, OQ
- Gilles Marcotte, CM, OQ
- Rémi Marcoux, CM, OQ
- Anne Claire Poirier, OC, OQ
- Mohamad Sawan, OQ
- Michèle Stanton-Jean, OQ
- Ashok K. Vijh, OC, OQ

==== Knight of the National Order of Québec ====
Undress ribbon for a Knight of the National Order of Québec

- Silvia Araya, CQ
- Antoine Ayoub, CM, CQ
- Georgette Beaudry, CQ
- Françoise Bertrand, CQ
- Gilles Bissonnette, CQ
- Émile Bouchard, CQ
- Raymond Brousseau, CQ
- Louis Caron, CQ
- Jacques Castonguay, CM, CQ
- François Chartier, CQ
- René Derouin, CQ
- Jacques Duchesneau, CM, CQ
- The Honourable Marisa Ferretti Barth, CQ
- Sheila Fischman, CM, CQ
- Dr. Pierre Fréchette, CQ
- Edgar Fruitier, CQ
- Sheila Goldbloom, CM, CQ
- Gisèle Gravel, CQ
- Henri Grondin, CQ
- Gloria Jeliu, CM, CQ
- Aida Kamar, CQ
- Nicolas Mateesco Matte, CM, CQ, FRSC
- Paul-Arthur Mckenzie, CQ
- Michel Pouliot, CQ
- Normand Séguin, CQ
- Peter Simons, CQ
- E. Noël Spinelli, CM, CQ
- Richard Tremblay, CQ
- Elena Venditelli Faita, CQ
- Yanick Villedieu, CQ

=== Saskatchewan Order of Merit ===
Undress ribbon for a member of the Saskatchewan Order of Merit

- The Honourable Edward D. Bayda, S.O.M., Q.C., LL.D. (1931-2010)
- Dr. Eli Bornstein, S.O.M.
- Dr. Elizabeth Brewster, C.M., S.O.M. (1922-2012)
- Elder Antoine (Tony) E. Cote, S.O.M.
- L. Irene Dubé, S.O.M., LL.D.
- Leslie D. Dubé, S.O.M., LL.D.
- Bob Ellard, S.O.M.
- Gavin Semple, S.O.M.

=== Order of Ontario ===
Undress ribbon for a member of the Order of Ontario

- Dr. Michael Baker
- Dr. Sheela Basrur
- George Brady
- Jack Chiang – journalist, community service
- Tony Dean
- Mary Dickson
- Noel Edison
- Frank Fernandes
- Jean-Robert Gauthier
- Sam George
- Heather Gibson
- Robert A. Gordon
- Gordon Gray
- Susan Hoeg
- Claude Lamoureux
- Patrick Le Sage
- Dr. Joe MacInnis
- Dr. David MacLennan
- Lorna Marsden
- David Peterson
- Ed Ratushny
- Rosemary Sadlier
- Dr. Fuad Sahin
- Barbara Ann Scott-King
- Ellen Seligman
- Peter Silverman
- David Smith
- Ted Szilva
- Mary Welsh

=== Order of British Columbia ===
Undress ribbon for a member of the Order of British Columbia

- Peter Legge
- Andrew Weaver
- Kathy Shields
- Harold Peter Capozzi
- Mohini Singh
- Arthur Freeman Vickers
- Kathy Louis
- Dr. Peter Ransford
- Kenneth William Daniel Shields
- Edward Harrison
- Dr. Kenneth Langelier
- Ann Mundigel Meraw
- Bruno Marti
- Dr. Charles Ludgate
- Gordon F. Gibson

=== Alberta Order of Excellence ===
Undress ribbon for a member of the Alberta Order of Excellence

=== Order of Prince Edward Island ===
Undress ribbon for a member of the Order of Prince Edward Island

=== Order of Manitoba ===
Undress ribbon for a member of the Order of Manitoba

=== Order of New Brunswick ===
Undress ribbon for a member of the Order of New Brunswick

=== Order of Nova Scotia ===
Undress ribbon for a member of the Order of Nova Scotia

=== Order of Newfoundland and Labrador ===
Undress ribbon for a member of the Order of Newfoundland and Labrador

== Military Valour Decorations ==
=== Star of Military Valour ===
Undress ribbon for the Star of Military Valour

- Major David Nelson Quick, S.M.V., C.D.
- Corporal James Ball, S.M.V.
- Captain Jonathan Snyder, S.M.V. (deceased)
- Sergeant William Kenneth MacDonald, S.M.V., C.D.

=== Medal of Military Valour ===
Undress ribbon for the Medal of Military Valour

- Sergeant Derek John Scott Fawcett, M.M.V, C.D.
- Private Shane Aaron Bradley Dolmovic, M.M.V.
- Corporal Dave Gionet, M.M.V.
- Master Corporal Gerald Alexander Killam, M.M.V, C.D.
- Private Jay James Renaud, M.M.V.
- Corporal Michel Beaulieu, M.M.V.
- Captain Joseph Maurice Jocelyn Bordeleau, M.M.V, C.D.
- Corporal Yan Dodier, M.M.V.
- Master Corporal Érik Dubois, M.M.V.
- Sergeant Stéphane Girard, M.M.V, C.D.
- Warrant Officer Joseph Yves Léon Gonneville, M.M.V, C.D.
- Warrant Officer Joseph Jacques Stéphane Grenier, M.M.V, C.D.
- Warrant Officer Joseph Mario Sylvain Isabelle, M.M.V, C.D.
- Major Michel Louis Lapointe, M.M.V., M.S.M., C.D.
- Corporal Edward R. G. Morley, M.M.V.
- Corporal Erik Poelzer, M.M.V.
- Captain Joseph Hughes Stéphane Tremblay, M.M.V, C.D.
- Corporal Cary Baker, M.M.V.
- Corporal Steven Bancarz, M.M.V.
- Captain Robert Peel, M.M.V, C.D.
- Major Joseph Antoine Dave Abboud, M.S.C., M.M.V, C.D.
- Corporal Alexandre Benjamin Jonathan Dion, M.M.V.
- Master Corporal Christopher Lorne Harding, M.M.V.
- Warrant Officer Tod Hopkin, M.M.V, C.D.
- Corporal Bryce Keller, M.M.V. (Posthumous)

== Canadian Bravery Decorations ==
=== Star of Courage ===
Undress ribbon for the Star of Courage

- RCMP Constable Timothy Dunlap
- Sergeant Paul David Phee
- RCMP Constable Guy Armand Raes
- James Alexander Santos

=== Medal of Bravery ===
Undress ribbon for the Medal of Bravery

- Lydia Angiyou
- Clint Antony Avery
- Constable Darren Wayne Barrington
- Constable Melbourne James Birmingham, M.B.* (This is a second award)
- O.P.P. Constable Micheal Edmond Cholette
- Master Corporal Brian Michael Decaire
- Steven Murray Flynn
- Cherilyn Patricia Gill
- Constable Ryan George Hutchison
- Barry George Kessler
- Acting Sergeant Wayne MacDonald, M.B.* (This is a second award)
- William Mann
- Vincent Lawrence Massey
- Alvaro Mejia
- Lisette Moar
- Robin Mole
- Theophillios Parusis
- Wayne Alton Russell
- Paul Anthony Skelton
- Sergeant Darcy J. L. J. St-Laurent, S.C., C.D.
- Paul Christopher Zakem
- Sony Anctil
- Stanley Anglin
- Petty Officer 1st class Alain Baillargeon, C.D. (deceased)
- Martin Baillargeon
- Constable Marco Barcarolo
- Marco Bédard
- Wesley Eugene Belland
- Allan Dale Bennett
- Constable Martin Bouchard
- Aaron Buffett
- Corporal Piotr Krzysztof Burcew
- Andrew Cartwright
- Edith Chamberland
- Richard K. Colbourne
- Philip Joseph Comeau
- Léonard Corbeil (posthumous)
- Constable Denis Côté
- Captain Jason Edward Demaine, C.D.
- Master-Corporal Jonas Denechezhe
- Constable Geneviève Descôteaux
- OPP Constable Dennis Armand Desjardins
- Constable Alain Ibrahim Diallo
- Sarto Duguay
- Constable Catherine Dumas
- Sergeant Carl Dussault
- Katayoun Eslah
- Brandon Fudge
- Harold Galliford
- Marc-Olivier Girard
- Mike Giroux
- David George Hamilton
- John Brendan Haney
- OPP Constable Walter Erik Howells
- Constable Henri-Louis Huot
- OPP Sergeant M. Adam W. Illman
- Aaron Alvin Karton
- Joseph Francis Kretschmer
- Stéphane Laplante
- Denis Lecuyer
- Richard Lemieux
- Lyne Lévesque
- John Lichtenwald
- Captain Dennis Mann
- Corporal Adrian Roman Markowski
- Mark Timothy McKay
- John Andrew Mellon
- Edwin Norbert Merasty
- Hussam Mohamed Meshmesha (posthumous)
- Yves Morin
- Floyd D. Morris
- Vincent Pascale, C.D.
- Constable Shawn Charles Piercey
- Richard Plaisted
- Richard K. Randall
- OPP Constable (retired) Gary Read
- Joseph Eugene Stanley Rucchin
- Ronald Savill (deceased)
- Tommy Servant Lantin
- Mohamed Rashed Shaban
- Eric Patrick Shaffer
- Kevan Thomas Shaw
- Constable Catherine Simard
- Sarah Elizabeth Joy Smith
- Constable James John Sophocleous
- Alphonse St. Pierre
- Master Corporal Stephen Louis Thomas
- John Austin Thriepland
- Tina Lee Trombley
- Clifford Tssessaze
- OPP Constable Stephen Waite
- Ralph Edward Walker
- David Wheesk
- Norman Clyde Winsor
- Corey William Wood
- Sergeant Lawrence James Zimmerman

== Meritorious Service Decorations ==
=== Meritorious Service Cross (Military Division) ===
- The Right Honourable Patricia Edwina Victoria Knatchbull, The 2nd Countess Mountbatten of Burma, C.B.E., M.S.C., C.D.
- Lieutenant-Colonel Simon Charles Hetherington, M.S.C., C.D.
- Lieutenant-Colonel Jean-Marc Lanthier, M.S.C., C.D.
- General Peter Pace, M.S.C., United States Marine Corps
- Master Warrant Officer William Alan Bolen, M.S.C., C.D.
- Chief Warrant Officer Robert Michel Joseph Girouard, M.S.C., C.D.
- General Lance L. Smith, M.S.C., United States Air Force
- Chief Warrant Officer Mark Leslie Baisley, M.S.C., C.D.
- Master Warrant Officer Wayne Alan Bartlett, M.S.C., C.D.
- Lieutenant-Colonel Wayne Donald Eyre, M.S.C., C.D.
- Warrant Officer Ian Long, M.S.C., C.D.
- Major Alexander Thomas Ruff, M.S.C., C.D.
- Lieutenant-Colonel Robert Daren Keith Walker, M.S.C., C.D.
- Brigadier-General Leslie Lawrence Fuller, M.S.C. (Retired), United States Army
- Lieutenant-Colonel Joseph Roger Alain Gauthier, M.S.C., C.D.
- Brigadier-General Joseph René Marcel Guy Laroche, O.M.M., M.S.C., C.D.
- Chief Warrant Officer Joseph Georges Jean Pierre Marchand, M.M.M., M.S.C., C.D.
- Master Warrant Officer Joseph Christian Michel Mario Mercier, M.S.C., C.D. (Posthumous)
- Major Joseph Antoine Dave Abboud, M.S.C., M.M.V., C.D.
- Lieutenant-Colonel Robert Keith Chamberlain, M.S.C., C.D.
- Colonel Nicolas Eldaoud, M.S.C., C.D.
- Major-General Timothy James Grant, O.M.M., M.S.C., C.D.
- General Raymond Roland Joseph Henault, C.M.M., M.S.C., C.D. (Retired)
- Lieutenant-Colonel Joseph Rosaire Aimé Stéphane Lafaut, M.S.C., C.D.
- Lieutenant-Colonel Paul Langlais, M.S.C., C.D.
- Colonel Michael John Pearson, M.S.C., C.D.
- Major-General Walter Semianiw, O.M.M., M.S.C., C.D.
- Lieutenant-General Waldemar Skrzypczak, M.S.C.

=== Meritorious Service Medal (Military Division) ===
- Master Warrant Officer John Gerard Barnes, M.S.M., C.D.
- Chief Warrant Officer Stephen Stanley Bartlett, M.S.M., C.D.
- Major JM François Bisaillon, M.S.M., C.D.
- Lieutenant-Colonel Shane Anthony Brennan, M.S.M., C.D.
- Chief Warrant Officer Claude Caron, M.M.M., M.S.M., C.D.
- Lieutenant-Colonel John David Conrad, M.S.M., C.D.
- Major Mark Anthony Gasparotto, M.S.M.
- Commander Darren Carl Hawco, M.S.M., C.D.
- Master-Corporal Lance Thomas Hooper, M.S.M., C.D.
- Major Gregory Wayne Ivey, M.S.M., C.D.
- Lieutenant-Colonel Colin Roy Keiver, M.S.M., C.D.
- Colonel Frederick A. Lewis, M.S.M., C.D.
- Major Andrew John Lussier, M.S.M., C.D.
- Captain Steven Kelly MacBeth, M.S.M., C.D.
- Master Warrant Officer Bradley William John Montgomery, M.S.M., C.D.
- Lieutenant-Colonel David Anthony Patterson, M.S.M., C.D.
- Captain Anthony Peter Robb, M.S.M.
- Corporal Jean-Paul Somerset, M.S.M.
- Lieutenant-Colonel Barry Marshall Southern, M.S.M., C.D.
- Major Matthew Bruce Sprague, M.S.M., C.D.
- Major Michael Charles Wright, M.M.V., M.S.M., C.D.
- Colonel Peter Gerald Abbott, M.S.M., C.D.
- Commander Steven Albert Bell, M.S.M., C.D.
- Colonel Stephen Joseph Bowes, M.S.C., M.S.M., C.D.
- Major Richard William R. Goodyear, M.S.M., C.D.
- Sergeant Abdoul Amtou Guindo, M.S.M.
- Colonel Joseph Jean René Guy Hamel, M.S.M., C.D.
- Major Andrew John Lutes, M.S.M., C.D.
- Lieutenant-Colonel David Brian Berry, M.S.M., C.D.
- Warrant Officer Jules Joseph Jean Bérubé, M.S.M., C.D.
- Major Thomas Bradley, M.S.M., C.D.
- Master Warrant Officer William John Crabb, M.S.M., C.D.
- Major Marc G. Diamond, M.S.M., C.D.
- Corporal Matthew John David Elliott, M.S.M.
- Major Steven Geoffrey Graham, M.S.M., C.D.
- Warrant Officer Eric Richard Green, M.S.M., C.D.
- Warrant Officer James Adam Hunter, M.S.M., C.D.
- Master Warrant Officer Stephen Goward Jeans, M.S.M., C.D.
- Petty Officer First Class Paul Joseph Ernest Lavigne, M.S.M., C.D.
- Corporal Brett James Lovelace, M.S.M.
- Commodore Paul Andrew Maddison, O.M.M., M.S.M., C.D.
- Master Warrant Officer William Alan Richards, M.S.M., C.D.
- Commodore Joseph Alphonse Denis Rouleau, O.M.M., M.S.M., C.D.
- Corporal James Michael Ryan, M.S.M.
- Colonel Richard Geoffrey St. John, M.S.M., C.D.
- Corporal Julie Marie Micheline Alain, M.S.M.
- Chief Warrant Officer Gilles Arcand, M.M.M., M.S.M., C.D.
- Captain Dennie Bourque, M.S.M.
- Colonel Andrew David Hawkesford Budd, M.S.M
- Corporal Pierre Brûlé Jr., M.S.M.
- Captain Robert Colbourne, M.S.M., C.D.
- Major Steven Pierre Desjardins, M.S.M., C.D.
- Corporal Philippe Fortin, M.S.M.
- Captain Frédérick Jean, M.S.M.
- Major Michel Louis Lapointe, M.M.V., M.S.M., C.D.
- Major Patrick Henri Gérard Hubert Robichaud, M.S.M., C.D.
- Lieutenant-Colonel Joseph Jean-Pierre Bergeron, M.S.M., C.D.
- Corporal Patrick James Berrea, M.S.M., C.D.
- Captain James Brennan, M.S.M., C.D.
- Master Corporal Christian Bureau, M.S.M.
- Chief Petty Officer 1st Class Raymond Côté, M.S.M., C.D.
- Corporal Dominic Couture, M.S.M.
- Master Warrant Officer Joseph Lucien André Demers, M.S.M., C.D.
- Master Corporal Steve Descarie, M.S.M., C.D.
- Master Corporal Danielle Dumas, M.S.M.
- Colonel Robert George (Geordie) Elms, M.S.M., C.D.
- Honorary Colonel Blake Charles Goldring, M.S.M.
- Major Pierre Huet, M.S.M., C.D.
- Colonel J. C. G. Juneau, M.S.M., C.D.
- Major Russell Joseph King, M.S.M., C.D.
- Lieutenant-Colonel Douglas Marvin Labrie, M.S.M., C.D.
- Chief Warrant Officer Michel Landry, M.S.M., C.D.
- Honorary Colonel Douglas Gordon Marr, M.S.M., C.D. (retired)
- Lieutenant-Colonel Michael Charles Maurer, M.S.M., C.D.
- Major James Duncan Mckillip, M.S.M.∗, C.D.
- Lieutenant-Colonel Christian Mercier, M.S.M., C.D.
- Major Richard Moffet, M.S.M., C.D.
- Master Warrant Officer André Moreau, M.S.M., C.D.
- Master Warrant Officer Sylvain Parent, M.S.M., C.D.
- Colonel Thomas Seay, M.S.M. of the United States of America
- Lieutenant Marc-Antoine Sigouin, M.S.M.
- Major Peter Richard Sullivan, M.S.M., C.D. (retired)
- Colonel Luther (Trey) S. Turner III, M.S.M. of the United States Air Force
- Commander Stephen Alexander Virgin, M.S.M., C.D.

== Mentions in Dispatches ==
- Private John Matt Andersen
- Captain Isabelle Marie-Ève Bégin
- Sergeant Jos Jean Éric Bergeron
- Corporal Philippe Berthiaume
- Master Corporal Marie Sylvie Annie Bilodeau
- Private David Blier
- Corporal Guillaume Boulay
- Private Michael Charlish
- Warrant Officer Robert Joseph Clarke, C.D.
- Captain Robert Colbourne, C.D.
- Master Corporal Russell Wayne Coughlin
- Leading Seaman Bruce Michael Crews
- Warrant Officer Joseph Lois Henri Dany De Chantal, C.D.
- Corporal Daniel Joseph Dulong, C.D.
- Master Corporal Shain Roy Dusenbury
- Corporal Jean-François Filion
- Master Corporal Timothy Wayne Fletcher, C.D.
- Master Corporal Joseph Daniel François Flibotte
- Sergeant Michael Girard, C.D.
- Warrant Officer Guevens Guimont, C.D.
- Captain Jonathan Hewson Hamilton
- Corporal Christopher Henderson
- Warrant Officer Darren John Hessell, C.D.
- Corporal Jason Hoekstra
- Sergeant Vaughan Ingram (Posthumous)
- Captain Ryan Edward Jurkowski, C.D.
- Corporal Stephen James Myers Keeble, C.D.
- Warrant Officer André Lamarre, C.D.
- Captain Marc-André Langelier
- Sergeant David L'Heureux, C.D.
- Captain Mark James Lubiniecki
- Corporal Nicolae Toma Lupu
- Private Michael Richard Stephen MacWhirter
- Captain Blair McNaught
- Master Corporal Christopher Michael Mistzal
- Captain Joseph Julien Daniel Morin
- Master Corporal Matthew Parsons
- Corporal Benjamin Joel Peach
- Captain Trevor Joseph Pellerine, C.D.
- Master Corporal Cécil David Plamondon
- Master Corporal Daryl Edward Presley
- Master Corporal Tracy Wavell Price
- Corporal Christopher Jonathan Reid (Posthumous)
- Lieutenant Benjamin Richard
- Major Robert Tennant Ritchie, C.D.
- Captain Danis Rouleau, C.D.
- Warrant Officer Joseph André Daniel Royer, C.D.
- Major Harjit Sajjan, C.D.
- Sergeant Scott Lee Schall, C.D.
- Captain Mark Andrew Sheppard
- Private Alex Shulaev
- Master Corporal Kelly Godfrey Smith
- Master Corporal Mark William Soper
- Private Randy Lee Volpatti
- Captain Michael Craig Volstad, C.D.
- Master Corporal Jeffrey Walsh
- Corporal Jonathan Francis Williams
- Master Corporal Christopher William John Woodhouse

== Commonwealth and Foreign Orders, Decorations and Medal awarded to Canadians ==
=== From Her Majesty The Queen in Right of the United Kingdom ===
==== Operational Service Medal (Afghanistan) ====
- Major I.W. McLean
- Major Steven William Riff
- Captain M. Turgeon
- Captain M. Walker
- Major Paul Gautron

==== Operational Service Medal (Iraq) ====
- Lieutenant J. Vallis

=== From the President of Austria ===
==== Decoration of Honour in Silver ====
- Ms. Gertrude Duller

=== From His Majesty The King of the Belgians ===
==== Grand Cross of the Order of the Crown ====
- General Raymond Henault

==== Commander of the Order of the Crown ====
- Mr. Jean-Pierre Kesteman

=== From the President of the French Republic ===
==== National Order of the Legion of Honour ====
===== Grand Cross =====
- Mr. Paul Desmarais

===== Commander =====
- The Honourable Jean Charest, PC, MNA

===== Officer =====
- Mrs. Lise Bissonnette
- Mr. Max "One Onti" Gros-Louis
- Mr. Michel Bissonnet

===== Knight =====
- Mrs. Diane Dufresne
- Mr. Michel Tremblay
- Mrs. Fatima Houda-Pépin

===== Officer =====
- Mr. Henri Grondin

===== Knight of the National Order of Merit =====
- Mrs. Suzanne Moffet
- Mrs. Marie-Claire Blais
- Mrs. Louise Cordeau
- Mrs. Suzanne Gouin
- Mr. Jacques Lacoursière
- Mrs. Francine Lelièvre
- Mr. Claude Lizé
- Mr. Alfred Pilon

==== Order of Arts and Letters ====
===== Commander of the Order of Arts and Letters =====
- Mr. Pierre Théberge

===== Officer of the Order of Arts and Letters =====
- Mr. Conrad Ouellon

===== Knight of the Order of Arts and Letters =====
- Mrs. Gisèle Delage
- Mrs. Claudette Fortier
- Mr. Guy Latraverse
- Mr. Gérald Paquette
- Mr. Gilles Pellerin
- Mr. Peter Boneham
- Mr. Daniel Poliquin

==== Knight of the Order of Agricultural Merit ====
- Mr. Yannick Folgoas
- Mr. Todd Halpern
- Mr. Fatos Pristine
- Mr. Jean-Guy Saint-Amand

==== Knight of the Order of Maritime Merit ====
- Mr. John Butler

==== Order of the Academic Palms ====
===== Officer =====
- Mr. Marc Arnal

===== Knight =====
- Mrs. Noella Arsenault-Cameron
- Mr. Paul Ceurstemont
- Mr. Peter John Edwards
- Mr. Jacques Frémont
- Mrs. Yolande Grisé
- Mr. Armand Saintonge

==== National Defence Medals ====
===== National Defence Medal, Gold Echelon with Clasp « Gendarmerie nationale » =====
- Associate Commissioner of the RCMP Walter Gérald Lynch

===== National Defence Medal, Silver Echelon with Clasp Land Forces =====
- Major Doris Gobeil

===== National Defence Medal, Silver Echelon with Clasps Land Force and exterior assistant mission =====
- Lieutenant-Colonel Jean-Claude Gagnon

=== From the President of the Federal Republic of Germany ===
==== Cross of the Order of Merit ====
- Mr. Graham Ford

=== From the Government of Hungary ===
==== Commander's Cross of the Order of Merit ====
- Mr. Béla Balázs

==== Knight's Cross of the Order of Merit ====
- Mrs. Éva Kossuth
- Rev. Leslie Laszlo
- Mrs. Mária Maíláth

=== From the President of Italy ===
==== Grand Officer of the Order of Merit ====
- Professor David N. Weisstub

==== Commander of the Order of Merit ====
- Mr. Emilio Panarella

==== Knight of the Order of Merit ====
- Mrs. Marianna Simeone

==== Grand Officier of the Order of the Star of Solidarity ====
- Mr. Christopher Alexander

==== Commander of the Order of the Star of Solidarity ====
- Mr. Salvatore Giovanni Ciccolini, C.M., O.Ont.
- Mr. Joseph Sorbara

==== Knight of the Order of the Star of Solidarity ====
- Mrs. Marie Chiarelli La Chimea
- Mr. Nicola Marrone
- Mr. Gilberto Baruzzo
- Mr. Luigi Cucchi
- Mr. Geller Garbagni
- Ms. Valeria Sestrieri Lee
- Mr. Raffaele Ercolano
- Mr. Lorenzo Michele Di Donato
- Mr. Fortunato Rao
- Mr. Giuseppe Paventi
- Mr. Vinci Biagio

=== From His Majesty The King of the Hashemite Kingdom of Jordan ===
==== Jordan International Police Training Centre Medal ====
The Chancellery of Honours is the custodian of the register of recipients of the medal

=== From His Majesty the King of Lesotho ===
==== Knight Commander of the Most Dignified Order of Moshoeshoe ====
- Mr. Stephen Lewis, CC

=== From His Royal Highness The Grand Duke of Luxembourg ===
==== Commander of the Oak Crown ====
- Mr. David Chestley Netterville

==== Commander of the Order of Merit ====
- Mr. David Cook

=== From Her Majesty The Queen of the Netherlands ===
==== Commander of the Order of Orange-Nassau ====
- General Rick J. Hillier

=== From the President of Nigeria ===
==== Member of the Order of the Federal Republic ====
- Mr. Vincent Del Buono

=== From the Secretary General of the North Atlantic Treaty Organisation ===
==== NATO Meritorious Service Medal ====
- Colonel Charles W. Attwood
- Mr. Jim Cargill
- Lieutenant-Colonel Marc Gendron
- Mr. Rohan Maxwell
- Major Peter Sullivan
- Lieutenant-General Angus Watt

=== From His Majesty The King of Norway ===
==== Order of Merit ====
- Dr. Christopher Hale
- Mr. Stein Gudmûndseth
- Mr. Eiving Hoff
- Mr. Robert Ian Collingwood
- Mr. Claude Page
- Mr. Richard W. Pound

=== From the President of Poland ===
==== Commander's Cross of the Order of Merit ====
- Major-General Reginald W. Lewis, C.M., C.M.M., C.D. (see Erratums)
- Mr. Bernd Goetze (see Erratums)

==== Officer's Cross of the Order of Merit ====
- Ms. Hannah Weinberg

==== Knight of the Order of the Cross of Merit ====
- Mrs. Maria Kaszuba
- Mr. Bernd Goetze (see Erratums)
- Mrs. Janina Maria Bolaszewska
- Mrs. Irena Maria Domecka
- Mrs. Jadwiga Janina Keats
- Mr. Stanislaw Leon Lis
- Mrs. Zofia Wawryniuk
- Mr. Walter Paszkowski
- Mrs. Maria Zielinska

==== Gold Cross of Merit ====
- Mrs. Malgorzata Boczkowska
- Mr. Aleksander Bozek
- Mrs. Elzbieta Gazda
- Mr. Stanislaw Glogowski
- Mrs. Halina Róznawska
- Mr. Zdzislaw Róznawski
- Mr. Ignacy Góral
- Mr. Jan Cymerman
- Mrs. Janina Kokociński
- Mr. Wladyslaw Kowal
- Mr. Antoni Kowal
- Mrs. Józefina Paweska
- Mrs. Maria Teresa Warnke
- Mr. Robert Zenon Żawierucha

==== Silver Cross of Merit ====
- Mr. Kazimierz Domanowski
- Mr. Janusz Drzymala
- Mr. Tadeusz Maziarz
- Mr. Zbigniew Mielczarek
- Mrs. Danuta Wronowski
- Mrs. Teresa Szramek

=== From His Majesty The King of Spain ===
==== The Cross of the Order of Civil Merit ====
- Dr. Patrick Barnabé
- Mr. Louis Holmes
- Mr. Marino Simioni

=== From the President of Ukraine ===
==== Order of Merit 3rd Class ====
- Mr. Andrew Hladyshevsky
- Mr. Peter Kule
- Dr. Bohdan Medwidsky
- Mr. Bohdan Onyschuk
- Dr. Peter Potichnyj
- Mr. Yaroslav Sokolyk

==== Order of Princess Olha 3rd Class ====
- Ms. Marsha Skrypuch
- Ms. Ruslana Wrzesnewskyj
- Ms. Zenia Kushpeta

==== Noble Work and Virtue ====
- Ms. Julia Krekhovetsky
- Ms. Marianne Lenchak Grosse
- Mr. Ivan Mazurenko
- Mr. Stefan Petelycky
- Ms. Emilia Stelmach

==== Order of Kniaz (King) Yaroslav The Wise, 5th Class ====
- The Honourable Raynell Andreychuk

=== From the President of United States of America ===
==== Officer of the Legion of Merit ====
- Brigadier-General Daniel J. Pépin
- Colonel Richard J. Giguère

==== Bronze Star Medal ====
- Colonel Robert Shaw

==== Meritorious Service Medal ====
- Major Daniel G. Daly
- Colonel Wade L. Hoddinott
- Lieutenant-Colonel Lawrence J. Zaporzan
- Petty Officer 2nd Class Jean Allard
- Warrant Officer Stephan Watters
- Lieutenant-Colonel William F. Schultz
- Chief Warrant Officer Derek J. W. Bisson
- Lieutenant-Colonel Stephen J. Delaney
- Major-General Peter J. Devlin
- Chief Warrant Officer Kenneth G. Hodge
- Major Robin F. Holman
- Lieutenant-Colonel Robert Kearney
- Lieutenant-Commander Craig J. McLay
- Major Yvonne K. Pratt
- Master Warrant Officer Gary M. Pullen
- Major David A. Quinn
- Lieutenant-Commander Troy D. White

==== Air Medal ====
- Captain Marc J. Delisle
- Captain Garry R. Wheaton

==== Air Medal and Air Medal (First Oak Leaf Cluster) ====
- Major Arthur J. Henry

==== Air Medal and Air Medal (First, Second, Third Oak Leaf Cluster) ====
- Major Henrik N. Smith

== Erratums of Commonwealth and Foreign Orders, Decorations and Medal awarded to Canadians ==
=== Correction of 28 June 2008 ===
- The notice published on page 181 of the 26 January 2008 issue of the Canada Gazette, Part I, is hereby amended as follows: From the President of Poland, the Knight's Cross of the Order of Merit to Mr. Bernd Goetze.

=== Corrections of 08 November 2008 ===
- The notice published on page 1944 of the 28 June 2008 issue of the Canada Gazette, Part I, is hereby amended as follows: From the President of Poland, Commander's Cross of the Order of Merit to Major-General Reginald W. Lewis.
- The notice published on page 2494 of the 30 August 2008 issue of the Canada Gazette, Part I, is hereby amended as follows: From Her Majesty The Queen in Right of the United Kingdom, the Operational Service Medal (Afghanistan) to Major Paul Gautron.
