= Finite mathematics =

Syllabus in college and university mathematics

In mathematics education, Finite Math is a syllabus in college and university mathematics that is independent of calculus. A course in precalculus may be a prerequisite for Finite Mathematics.

Contents of the course include an eclectic selection of topics often applied in social science and business, such as finite probability spaces, matrix multiplication, Markov processes, finite graphs, or mathematical models. These topics were used in Finite Mathematics courses at Dartmouth College as developed by John G. Kemeny, Gerald L. Thompson, and J. Laurie Snell and published by Prentice-Hall. Other publishers followed with their own topics. With the arrival of software to facilitate computations, teaching and usage shifted from a broad-spectrum Finite Mathematics with paper and pen, into development and usage of software.

== Textbooks ==
- 1957: Kemeny, Thompson, Snell, Introduction to Finite Mathematics, (2nd edition 1966) Prentice-Hall
- 1959: Hazelton Mirkil & Kemeny, Thompson, Snell, Finite Mathematical Structures, Prentice-Hall
- 1962: Arthur Schliefer Jr. & Kemeny, Thompson, Snell, Finite Mathematics with Business Applications, Prentice-Hall
- 1969: Marvin Marcus, A Survey of Finite Mathematics, Houghton-Mifflin
- 1970: Guillermo Owen, Mathematics for Social and Management Sciences, Finite Mathematics, W. B. Saunders
- 1970: Irving Allen Dodes, Finite Mathematics: A Liberal Arts Approach, McGraw-Hill
- 1971: A.W. Goodman & J. S. Ratti, Finite Mathematics with Applications, Macmillan
- 1971: J. Conrad Crown & Marvin L. Bittinger, Finite Mathematics: a modeling approach, (2nd edition 1981) Addison-Wesley
- 1977: Robert F. Brown & Brenda W. Brown, Applied Finite Mathematics, Wadsworth Publishing
- 1980: L.J. Goldstein, David I. Schneider, Martha Siegel, Finite Mathematics and Applications, (7th edition 2001) Prentice-Hall
- 1981: John J. Costello, Spenser O. Gowdy, Agnes M. Rash, Finite Mathematics with Applications, Harcourt, Brace, Jovanovich
- 1982: James Radlow, Understanding Finite Mathematics, PWS Publishers
- 1984: Daniel Gallin, Finite Mathematics, Scott Foresman
- 1984: Gary G. Gilbert & Donald O. Koehler, Applied Finite Mathematics, McGraw-Hill
- 1984: Frank S. Budnick, Finite Mathematics with Applications in Management and the Social Sciences, McGraw Hill
- 2011: Rupinder Sekhon, Applied Finite Mathematics, Open Textbook Library
- 2015: Chris P. Tsokos & Rebecca D. Wooten, The Joy of Finite Mathematics, Academic Press

== See also ==
- Business mathematics § Undergraduate
- Discrete mathematics
- Finite geometry
- Finite group, Finite ring, Finite field
- Finite topological space
