= Chance-constrained portfolio selection =

Approach to portfolio selection under loss aversion

Chance-constrained portfolio selection is an approach to portfolio selection under loss aversion. The formulation assumes that: (i) investor's preferences are representable by the expected utility of final wealth; and that (ii) they require that the probability of their final wealth falling below a survival or safety level must be acceptably low. The chance-constrained portfolio problem is then to find:

Max $\sum_{j}$w_{j}E(X_{j}), subject to Pr($\sum_{j}$ w_{j}X_{j} < s) ≤ α, $\sum_{j}$w_{j} = 1, w_{j} ≥ 0 for all j,

where s is the survival level and α is the admissible probability of ruin; w is the weight being sought; and X is the value of the jth asset to be included in the portfolio.

The approach is typically applied only by sophisticated quantitative investors. Hedge funds may use this given their need for tightly controlled risk metrics, including probabilistic drawdown control, Value-at-Risk-based optimization, and model uncertainty management. Pension funds and insurance firms will sometimes apply this to liability-driven investing (LDI) to ensure a portfolio meets funding targets with a minimum probability.

The original implementation is based on the seminal work of Abraham Charnes and William W. Cooper on chance constrained programming in 1959, and was first applied to finance by Bertil Naslund and Andrew B. Whinston in 1962 and in 1969 by N. H. Agnew, et al.

For fixed α the chance-constrained portfolio problem represents lexicographic preferences and is an implementation of capital asset pricing under loss aversion. In general though, it is observed that no utility function can represent the preference ordering of chance-constrained programming because a fixed α does not admit compensation for a small increase in α by any increase in expected wealth.

For a comparison to mean-variance and safety-first portfolio problems, see; for a survey of solution methods here, see; for a discussion of the risk aversion properties of chance-constrained portfolio selection, see.

== See also ==
- Capital asset pricing model
- Expected utility theory
- Financial risk management § Investment management
- Kelly criterion
- Lexicographic preferences
- Loss aversion
- Portfolio optimization
- Post modern portfolio theory
- Roy's safety-first criterion
- Stochastic programming
