= Jadranka Skorin-Kapov =

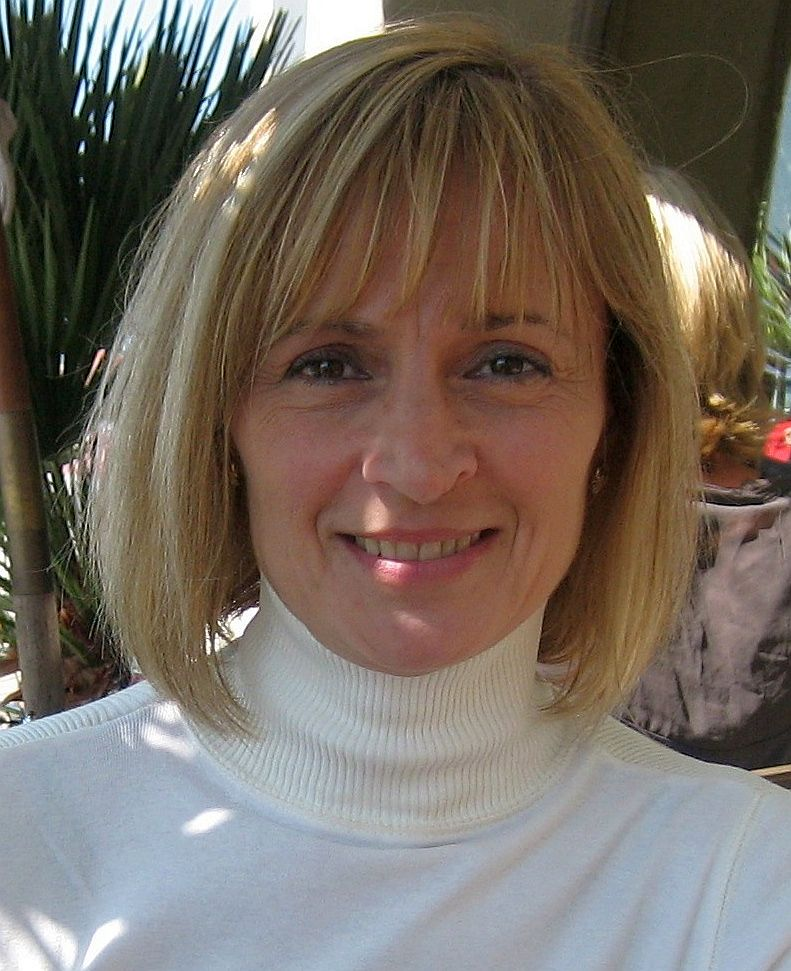
- Born: Jadranka Boljunčić; 1955 (age 70–71); Pula, SR Croatia
- Education: Stony Brook University; University of British Columbia; University of Zagreb
- Known for: Operations research, Continental philosophy, film studies

Jadranka Skorin-Kapov (born as Jadranka Boljunčić in 1955) is a professor at the State University of New York at Stony Brook in the College of Business, and with affiliated positions in the Department of Philosophy and the Department of Applied Mathematics and Statistics. Her background includes PhD degrees in Operations Research, in Philosophy, and in Art History. She served as the Head of Management Area in the College of Business from 2015 to 2024. She founded and currently directs the Center for Integration of Business Education & Humanities (CIBEH). Skorin-Kapov received the SUNY Chancellor's Award for Excellence in Scholarship and Creative Activities in 2016. In 2017 Skorin-Kapov received the Ideas Worth Teaching Award from the Aspen Institute business and society program. In 2020 Skorin-Kapov was elected as the corresponding member of the Croatian Academy of Sciences and Arts in the Department of Social Sciences. In 2022 Skorin-Kapov was appointed as the SUNY Distinguished Teaching Professor, State University of New York.

== Biography ==
Jadranka Skorin-Kapov was born in Pula, Croatia in 1955. In 1973 she moved to Zagreb to study mathematics at the University of Zagreb, graduating in 1977. While still an undergraduate student, in 1976 she married her classmate Darko Skorin-Kapov. Their daughters were born in 1979 and 1981. In 1984 the Skorin-Kapov's received doctoral fellowships from the University of British Columbia, the Sauder School of Business, and the family moved to Vancouver, British Columbia, Canada.

Jadranka Skorin-Kapov received her PhD in Operations Research in 1987, at the University of British Columbia, supervised by Frieda Granot. After continuing at UBC for a year as a visiting professor, she accepted a tenure track position at Stony Brook University. At Stony Brook University, Skorin-Kapov got early tenure and promotion to associate professor in 1993, followed by early promotion to professor in 1998. While working as a full-time professor, Skorin-Kapov studied philosophy, receiving her PhD in Philosophy from Stony Brook University in 2007. In 2009 Skorin-Kapov enrolled in the PhD program in Art History and Criticism at Stony Brook University, and in 2014 received her third PhD, this one dealing with Film Studies.

== Research and publications ==
Skorin-Kapov has about 70 refereed publications in Operations Research, and has received various grants and awards, including five National Science Foundation grants and a Fulbright award. Her scholarship in operations research includes development of algorithms (heuristic search and learning, and polynomial algorithms for special cases) and applications of discrete optimization to location and layout, telecommunications, scheduling, manufacturing design, and network design. Her research in optimization falls into four main clusters: exact solvability of nonlinear integer programs, heuristic solvability of the quadratic assignment problem (QAP), heuristic solvability and sensitivity analysis for the Hub Location Problem (HLP), and optimization in optical networks design.

Under her maiden name, in 1995 Skorin-Kapov published a collection of poetry in Chakavian dialect (Čakavski) of Croatian language, entitled Vajk z manon. The foreword is written by Milan Rakovac.

Skorin-Kapov's work in continental philosophy appeared in The Aesthetics of Desire and Surprise: Phenomenology and Speculation. This book covers issues central to contemporary continental philosophy: desire, expectations, excess, rupture, transcendence, immanence, and surprise. The proposed term desire||surprise captures the phenomenological- speculative character of the pair not yet and no longer. Skorin-Kapov draws non-obvious parallels between different thinkers, including Levinas, Žižek, Bataille, Blanchot, Foucault, Ricoeur, Deleuze, Merleau-Ponty, Nancy, Lyotard, and Bachelard. She argues that the works of Hegel, Schelling and Jaspers support the idea that the beginning of aesthetics is where knowledge ends. A review of the book appeared in Notre Dame Philosophical Reviews April 13, 2016.

Skorin-Kapov's subsequent bookThe Intertwining of Aesthetics and Ethics: Exceeding of Expectations, Ecstasy, Sublimity analyzes the common experiential ground for both aesthetics and ethics. As for understanding the aesthetic experience as the paradigmatic experience, Skorin-Kapov is informed by Dewey's work on art as experience, Gadamer's work on experience of art, and Jauss's work on the aesthetics of reception and the horizon of expectations. Elements of Kantian morality, Foucault's ethics, and Kierkegaard's work on interactions between aesthetics and ethics together help to characterize the relation between aesthetics and ethics. Considering surprise due to unexpectedness in comedy, Skorin-Kapov interprets philosophical views on the comedy and laughter (including Aristotle, Kierkegaard, Meredith, and Bergson), using the theatrical work of Dario Fo as an example. A review of the book appeared in The Review of Metaphysics, Vol. LXX, No. 4 (June 2017).

Skorin-Kapov's work in film studies includes a book on the oeuvre of the film director, screenwriter, and producer Darren Aronofsky, entitled Darren Aronofsky’s Films and the Fragility of Hope. She deploys her background in philosophy and math to analyze Aronofsky's varied filmography, including π (1998), Requiem for a Dream (2000), The Fountain (2006), The Wrestler (2008), Black Swan (2010), and Noah (2014). Aronofsky is revealed to be a philosopher's director, considering the themes of life and death, addiction and obsession, sacrifice, and the fragility of hope. Skorin-Kapov discusses his ability to visually present challenging intersections between not only art and philosophy, but also math, psychology, and art history. The book concludes with a transcript of a conversation between Skorin-Kapov and Aronofsky himself. A review of the book appeared in Alphaville: Journal of Film and Screen Media.

Skorin-Kapov developed a course Business Ethics: Critical Thinking through Film. In 2017 this course won the Ideas Worth Teaching Award from the Aspen Institute business and society program. In the interview entitled What Films Can Teach Us About Business Ethics and published in the Education section of The Aspen Institute Newsletter, Skorin-Kapov argues for the impact of humanistic elements in business education. In 2018 Skorin-Kapov's book Professional and Business Ethics through Film: The Allure of Cinematic Presentation and Critical Thinking was published by Palgrave Macmillan. The book considers a number of real world cases and a number of films presenting ethical issues arising in professional and business settings.
