= Rajiv Banker =

American academic

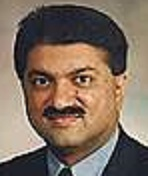
Rajiv Banker in 2003

Rajiv Dushyant Banker (1953 – March 1, 2023) was an accounting researcher and educator, recognized by the Institute for Scientific Information (Web of Science) as one of the 150 most influential researchers in economics and business. He is known for his pioneering work in data envelopment analysis.

Banker was the Director of the Center for Accounting and Information Technology at the Fox School of Business and Management, Temple University. He was also President of the International Data Envelopment Analysis Society and Editor-in-Chief of the Data Envelopment Analysis Journal.

== Education and career ==
Banker obtained his Bachelor of Science degree at the University of Bombay in 1973, and his Doctorate in Business Administration at Harvard University in 1980.

His early research focused on productivity, economies of scale, operational efficiency, and data envelopment analysis. His research on data envelopment analysis includes 15 articles co-authored with William W. Cooper from 1984 to 2011.

In 1995, Banker co-authored a textbook called Management Accounting with Anthony Akinson, Robert S. Kaplan and Mark Young. This textbook is now in its third edition. He also co-authored a book on the balanced scorecard.

From mid 2004 to early 2005, Banker served only a short term as Dean of the A. Gary Anderson Graduate School of Management (AGSM) at the University of California Riverside, during which he spent considerable time in India conducting research, and then later served as a "special assistant" in the chancellor's office after leaving his position as Dean.

From 2014 to 2016, Banker's research contributions include 15 articles on accounting, information systems, operations management and management science. Many of these articles were published in top journals, such as the Journal of Accounting and Economics Accounting Review, Accounting Horizons, and MIS Quarterly. At the time of his death, Banker was working on stochastic DEA with Professor Ruggiero.

== Awards ==
Banker has received five prestigious awards from the American Accounting Association. These awards include the Lifetime Contribution to Management Accounting Award (2017), the Notable Contribution to Management Accounting Literature Award (2015)(2002), the Journal of Management Accounting Research Best Paper Award (2004), and the Award for Notable Contribution to Public Sector Accounting Literature (1991).

He has received three teaching awards, based on votes from graduate and undergraduate students.

== Selected publications ==
- “Demand Uncertainty and Cost Behavior” with D. Byzalov and J. Plehn-Dujowich, The Accounting Review, 89, 3, (May 2014), pp. 839–865.
- “An Empirical Investigation of an Incentive Plan that Includes Nonfinancial Performance Measures,” with G. Potter and D. Srinivasan, Accounting Review, 75, 1, (January 2000), pp. 65–92.
- “An Introduction to Data Envelopment Analysis with Some of its Models and Their Uses,” with Abraham Charnes, William W. Cooper, J. Swarts and D. Thomas, Research in Governmental and Nonprofit Accounting, (1989), pp. 125–164
- “Constrained Game Formulations and Interpretations for Data Envelopment Analysis,” with Abraham Charnes, R. Clarke, and William W. Cooper, European Journal of Operational Research, (1989), pp. 299–308.
- “Some Models for Estimating Technical and Scale Inefficiencies in Data Envelopment Analysis,” with Abraham Charnes and William W. Cooper, Management Science, 30, 9, (September 1984), pp. 1078–1092.
