= Edwardo Rhodes =

Edwardo Lao Rhodes (born 1946) is an American management science scholar and author. An Emeritus Professor at the Indiana University School of Public and Environmental Affairs, Rhodes is best known for his seminal work in data envelopment analysis, as well as his applications of management science to policy analysis and environmental policy.

== Academic career ==
Rhodes received a Bachelor of Arts at Princeton University in 1968 and a Ph.D. from Carnegie Mellon University in 1978 under the supervision of William W. Cooper. While he started his professional career at the State University of New York at Buffalo, Rhodes developed most of his career as a professor of the School of Public and Environmental Affairs at Indiana University where he reached the status of Professor Emeritus.

== Research ==
Rhodes is known for the invention of data envelopment analysis in 1978, as part of his doctoral dissertation, in the paper "Measuring the Efficiency of Decision Making Units" with William W. Cooper and Abraham Charnes.

After devoting several years to developing applications of management science to public policy and particularly to environmental policy, Rhodes wrote "Environmental Justice in America: A New Paradigm" in 2003. In the book, Rhodes discusses new methodological approaches to environmental justice and argues that race and class are relevant categories previously ignored in analyzing environmental justice issues. Rhodes primary solution to these given problems is DEA (Data Envelopment Analysis), which is a mathmathical tool that allows for the combination of multiple risks such as; air quality, water toxins and waste sites into one singualr score for a community.
