= J. Laurie Snell =

American mathematician

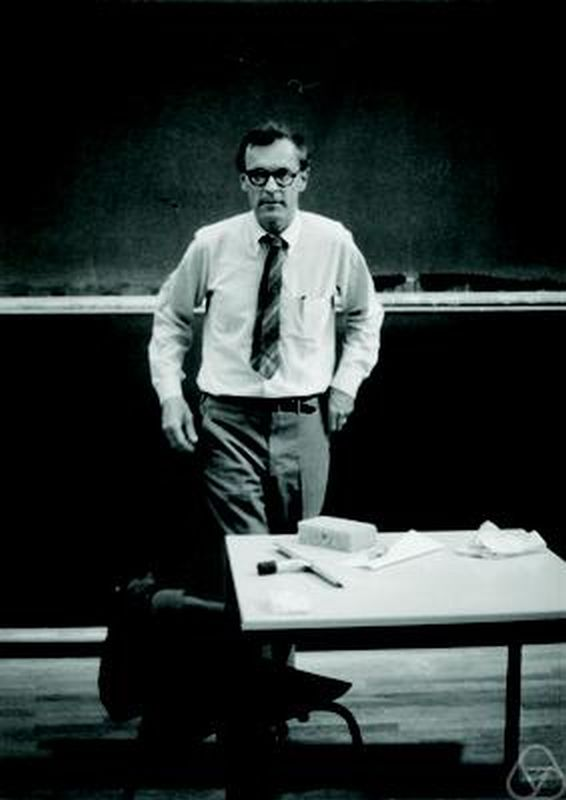
James Laurie Snell

James Laurie Snell (January 15, 1925 in Wheaton, Illinois – March 19, 2011 in Hanover, New Hampshire) was an American mathematician and educator.

== Biography ==
J. Laurie Snell was the son of Roy Snell, an adventure author, and Lucille, a concert pianist. Lucille taught the three sons (Jud, John and Laurie) to play piano, cello, and violin. The family had a life-lease on a cabin in Isle Royale National Park where they would go for summer holidays.

== Graduate work ==
Snell studied mathematics at the University of Illinois with Joseph L. Doob from 1948 through 1951; Doob introduced him to martingales, an aspect of probability theory. (Note: Quoted from Snell's Obituary of Joseph L. Doob: A discrete-time martingale is a sequence of random variables with finite expectation such that the expected value of any of the random variables, given the previous outcomes, is equal to the last outcome. Thus, if we interpret the outcomes as our fortune in a game, at each stage the game seems fair. So, we can think of a martingale as representing a fair game. If the expected value is less than or equal to the last outcome, then we say the process is a supermartingale and, if it is greater than or equal to the last value, then it is called a submartingale. Thus, a supermartingale represents an unfavorable game and a submartingale a favorable game. These names are suggested by probabilistic potential theory, where martingales correspond to harmonic functions, supermartingales to superharmonic functions, and submartingales to subharmonic functions.) Doob assigned such topics by having students attempt to solve a series of problems that he kept on file cards. (Note: Quoted from Snell's Obituary of Joseph L. Doob: Doob kept a card file of ideas for theses. When he got a new graduate student he would pull out a card and suggest the problem on the card. If the student could not solve it, Doob put it back in the file and chose the next card...I succeeded on the third card, which proposed extending to submartingales an inequality called the "upcrossing inequality" that Doob proved for martingales and used to prove his martingale convergence theorem. This inequality for a submartingale $Y_1, Y_2, ...$ would, for a < b, give an upper bound in terms of $E(|Y_n|)$ for the expected number of times the sample path can go from below a to above b, up to time n. This bound implied that if $E(|Y_n|) < k$ for some constant k, then the sample paths cannot oscillate infinitely often between a and b with positive probability, which implies that the submartingale converges with probability 1.) Snell earned his Ph.D. in 1951 ("Applications of Martingale System Theorems"), with Doob as his supervisor.

== Dartmouth College ==
At Dartmouth College Snell became involved in a mathematics department project to develop a course on modern mathematics used in biological and social sciences. He worked with John G. Kemeny and Gerald L. Thompson to write Introduction to Finite Mathematics (1957) which described probability theory, linear algebra, and applications in sociology, genetics, psychology, anthropology, and economics. They found "the basic ideas of finite mathematics were easier to state and theorems about them considerably easier to prove than their infinite counterparts." A French translation was made by M. C. Loyau and published in 1960 by Donod.

Another colleague at Dartmouth, Hazleton Mirkil, joined the team to write Finite Mathematical Structures (1959) for sophomores at Dartmouth studying science. Infinite problems are considered after their finite counterparts are fully developed in the text. In 1962 the publisher Prentice-Hall issued a third book from a Dartmouth team: Kemeny, Snell, Thompson, and Arthur Schleifer Jr. wrote Finite Mathematics with Business Applications which included applications: computer circuits, critical path analysis, flow diagrams for computing and accounting procedures, Monte Carlo simulation of decision processes, reliability, decision theory, waiting line theory, a simple approach to mathematics of finance, matrix games, and the simplex method for solving linear programming problems. A second edition of the first text came out in 1966.

== Writings ==
In 1959 Snell published a survey article on Markov chains. He worked the material into a book Finite Markov Chains with Kemeny. As the "first self-contained account in English", it attracted wide interest. While one reviewer said "the exposition is of high quality", other reviewers found fault: Too little attention paid to assumptions inherent in a model. "Interest builds steadily as one peruses the book." But "little attention to historical development." "From the point of view of an undergraduate ... the opening chapter on mathematical prerequisites is rather frightening." "Does not supersede the corresponding chapters in Feller's classic Introduction to Probability; "No index and not even the sketchiest bibliography."

Snell started Chance News in 1992 to "review news and journal articles pertaining to probability and statistics in the real world." One feature is Forsooth for statistical gaffes in media reports, a column originally found in the newsletter of the Royal Statistical Society. In 2005 Chance News was moved to Chance Wiki where there is an archive of Forsooths and previous News. Out of collaborations in Chance News with Charles M. Grinstead and William P. Peterson, a book Probability Tales (2011) was published by American Mathematical Society in the Student Mathematical Library. The book covers four topics: streaks in sports as streaks of successful Bernoulli trials (like hitting streaks), constructing stock market models, estimating expected value of a lottery ticket, and reliability of fingerprint identification.

== Legacy ==
Snell retired in 1995 and was elected as a fellow of the American Statistical Association in 1996.

The Snell envelope, used in stochastics and mathematical finance, is the smallest supermartingale dominating the price process. The Snell envelope refers to results in a 1952 paper Applications of martingale system theorems.

== Books ==
- 1957: (with John G. Kemeny and Gerald L. Thompson) Introduction to Finite Mathematics Prentice Hall Online
- 1959: (with Kemeny, Thompson & Hazleton Mirkil) Finite Mathematical Structures
- 1960: (with John G. Kemeny) Finite Markov Chains, D. van Nostrand Company ISBN 0-442-04328-7
- 1962: (with Kemeny, Thompson & Arthur Schleifer Jr.) Finite Mathematics with Business Applications
- 1962: (with John G. Kemeny) Mathematical Models in the Social Sciences, Ginn and Company
- 1966: (with J.G. Kemeny & A.W. Knapp) Denumerable Markov Chains, second edition 1976, Springer-Verlag
- 1980: (with Ross Kindermann) Markov Random Fields and Their Applications, American Mathematical Society ISBN 0-8218-5001-6, ISBN 978-0-8218-5001-5
- 1980: (with Ross P. Kindermann) "On the relation between Markov random fields and social networks", Journal of Mathematical Sociology 7(1): 1–13.
- 1984: (with Peter G. Doyle) Random Walks and Electrical Networks, Mathematical Association of America ISBN 0-88385-024-9
- 1988: Introduction To Probability, Random House ISBN 0-394-34485-5
- 1997: (with Charles Grinsted) Introduction to Probability second edition, American Mathematical Society, ISBN 0-8218-0749-8, ISBN 978-0-8218-0749-1 (online)
- 2011: (with C.M. Grinstead & W.P. Peterson) Probability Tales, American Mathematical Society ISBN 978-0-8218-5261-3
