= Oskar Morgenstern =

German economist (1902–1977)

- Born: January 24, 1902; Görlitz, Kingdom of Prussia, German Empire
- Died: July 26, 1977 (aged 75); Princeton, New Jersey, U.S.
- Known for: Game theory; Decision theory

Academic background
- Education: University of Vienna
- Doctoral advisor: Ludwig von Mises
- Influences: Othmar Spann; Carl Menger

Academic work
- Discipline: Economics
- Sub-discipline: Mathematical economics
- Institutions: University of Vienna; Princeton University; New York University; Mathematica Policy Research
- Doctoral students: Martin Shubik; Lionel W. McKenzie

Oskar Morgenstern (German: [ˈmɔʁɡn̩ʃtɛʁn]; January 24, 1902 – July 26, 1977) was a German-born economist. In collaboration with mathematician John von Neumann, he is credited with founding the field of game theory and its application to social sciences and strategic decision-making. He also made significant contributions to decision theory (see von Neumann–Morgenstern utility theorem).

He served as a consultant or co-founder for companies including the Market Research Corporation of America and the original Mathematica Inc.

== Biography ==
Morgenstern was born in Görlitz in the Prussian Province of Silesia. His mother was rumored to be a daughter of Emperor Frederick III.

Morgenstern grew up in Vienna, Austria, where he attended university. In 1925, he graduated from the University of Vienna with a PhD in political science. From 1925 to 1928, he undertook a three-year fellowship financed by the Rockefeller Foundation. After his return in 1928, he became a professor of economics at the University of Vienna, a position he held until he visited Princeton University in 1938. In 1935, Morgenstern published the article Perfect Foresight and Economic Equilibrium, after which his colleague Eduard Čech directed him to an article by John von Neumann, Zur Theorie der Gesellschaftsspiele (1928). He also worked as an outside expert for the Economic and Financial Organization, along with Bertil Ohlin and Jacques Rueff, supporting the EFO's work on economic depressions in the late 1930s.

During Morgenstern's visit to Princeton University, Adolf Hitler took over Vienna during the Anschluss, and Morgenstern chose to remain in the United States. He became a faculty member at Princeton but gravitated toward the Institute for Advanced Study where he met von Neumann. Together, they collaborated on writing Theory of Games and Economic Behavior, published in 1944. The work is recognized as the first book on game theory, a mathematical framework for studying strategic structures governing rational decision-making in economic, political, and military situations. In 2013, the University of Vienna relocated the Faculty of Business, Economics and Statistics and named the square Oskar-Morgenstern-Platz in his honor.

The collaboration between Morgenstern and von Neumann led to new areas of investigation in both mathematics and economics, attracting widespread academic and practical interest. In 1944, Morgenstern became a United States citizen, and four years later he married Dorothy Young, with whom he had two children, Carl and Karin. In 1950, he was elected as a Fellow of the American Statistical Association. Morgenstern remained at Princeton as a professor of economics until his retirement in 1970, after which he joined the faculty of New York University. Morgenstern authored numerous articles and books, including On the Accuracy of Economic Observations and Predictability of Stock Market Prices with subsequent Nobel laureate Clive Granger.

Morgenstern died in Princeton, New Jersey in 1977. The archive of his of published and unpublished works is held at Duke University.

In November 2012, a square in Alsergrund, Vienna, was named "Oskar-Morgenstern-Platz"; it is the location of the Faculties of Economics and Mathematics of the University of Vienna.

In 2013, the University of Vienna awarded the Oskar Morgenstern Medal for the first time; the inaugural recipient was Nobel laureate Roger B. Myerson. Subsequent recipients include Robert F. Engle (2015), Ernst Fehr (2017), Christopher Pissarides (2019), Muriel Niederle (2021), Thomas Piketty (2023) and Phanish Puranam (2025).

== Mathematica ==
In 1958-59, Morgenstern and several Princeton University colleagues started a "small research organization" that became later known as Mathematica Inc.

He was involved as a founder or co-founder in the following companies:

- Industrial Surveys Company (later Market Research Corporation of America)
- Mathematica Inc., and its successor Mathematica Policy Research (MPR)

== Bibliography ==
- Morgenstern, Oskar (1966) [1950]. On the accuracy of economic observations (2nd rev. ed.). Princeton, New Jersey: Princeton University Press.
- von Neumann, John; Morgenstern, Oskar (1955) [1944]. Theory of games and economic behaviour (3rd ed.). Princeton, New Jersey: Princeton University Press.
- Kemeny, John G.; Morgenstern, Oskar; Thompson, Gerald L. (1956). "A generalization of the von Neumann model of an expanding economy". Econometrica. 24 (2): 115–135. doi:10.2307/1905746. JSTOR 1905746. MR 0080573.
- Morgenstern, Oskar (1972). "Thirteen Critical Points in Contemporary Economic Theory: An Interpretation," Journal of Economic Literature 10, no. 4 (December):: 1184

– reprinted in Selected Economic Writings by Oskar Morgenstern, Andrew Schotter, ed. (New York: New York University Press, 1976), p. 288.

- Morgenstern, Oskar (1959). While the Atomic Clock Ticks On – The Question Of National Defense.
- Morgenstern, Oskar; Granger, Clive W. J. (1970). Predictability of stock market prices. Lexington, Massachusetts: Lexington Books (D.C. Heath and Company).
- Morgenstern, Oskar; Thompson, Gerald L. (1976). Mathematical theory of expanding and contracting economies. Lexington Books. Lexington, Massachusetts: D. C. Heath and Company. pp. xviii, 277.
- Morgenstern, Oskar (1976). "The collaboration between Oskar Morgenstern and John von Neumann on the Theory of Games". Journal of Economic Literature 14, No. 3 (Sep., 1976), pp. 805–816

– reprinted in Theory of games and economic behaviour — Sixtieth anniversary edition. Princeton, New Jersey: Princeton University Press, p. 712. ISBN 0-691-13061-2.

== Sources ==
- Shapley, D. (August 12, 1977). "Game theorist Morgenstern dies". Science. 197 (4304): 649. Bibcode:1977Sci...197..649S. doi:10.1126/science.197.4304.649. PMID 17776264.
- Marget, Arthur W. (1929). "Morgenstern on the Methodology of Economic Forecasting". Journal of Political Economy. 37 (3): 312–339.
