= Snell envelope =

Used in stochastics and mathematical finance

The Snell envelope, used in stochastics and mathematical finance, is the smallest supermartingale dominating a stochastic process. The Snell envelope is named after James Laurie Snell.

== Definition ==
Given a filtered probability space $(\Omega,\mathcal{F},(\mathcal{F}_t)_{t \in [0,T]},\mathbb{P})$ and an absolutely continuous probability measure $\mathbb{Q} \ll \mathbb{P}$ then an adapted process $U = (U_t)_{t \in [0,T]}$ is the Snell envelope with respect to $\mathbb{Q}$ of the process $X = (X_t)_{t \in [0,T]}$ if

1. $U$ is a $\mathbb{Q}$-supermartingale
2. $U$ dominates $X$, i.e. $U_t \geq X_t$ $\mathbb{Q}$-almost surely for all times $t \in [0,T]$
3. If $V = (V_t)_{t \in [0,T]}$ is a $\mathbb{Q}$-supermartingale which dominates $X$, then $V$ dominates $U$.

== Construction ==
Given a (discrete) filtered probability space $(\Omega,\mathcal{F},(\mathcal{F}_n)_{n = 0}^N,\mathbb{P})$ and an absolutely continuous probability measure $\mathbb{Q} \ll \mathbb{P}$ then the Snell envelope $(U_n)_{n = 0}^N$ with respect to $\mathbb{Q}$ of the process $(X_n)_{n = 0}^N$ is given by the recursive scheme

$$U_N := X_N,$$
$U_n := X_n \lor \mathbb{E}^{\mathbb{Q}}[U_{n+1} \mid \mathcal{F}_n]$ for $n = N-1,...,0$

where $\lor$ is the join (in this case equal to the maximum of the two random variables).

== Application ==
- If $X$ is a discounted American option payoff with Snell envelope $U$ then $U_t$ is the minimal capital requirement to hedge $X$ from time $t$ to the expiration date.
