= Roy J. Snell =

American novelist

- Born: November 20, 1878; Laddonia, Missouri, US
- Died: September 21, 1959 (aged 80); Wheaton, Illinois, US
- Occupations: Writer, minister
- Spouse: Lucile
- Relatives: J. Laurie Snell, son
- Writing career
- Pen name: David O'Hara, James Craig, Joseph Marino
- Period: 20th century
- Genre: Juvenile fiction

Roy Judson Snell (November 20, 1878 – September 21, 1959) was an American writer of fiction mainly for young readers.

== Biography ==
Snell was born in Laddonia, Missouri on November 12, 1878, to James and Sarah Knight-Snell.

Snell wrote several juvenile fiction books. While he mostly concentrated on stories for boys there was at least one series of mysteries for girls. He also wrote under the pen names of David O'Hara, James Craig and Joseph Marino.

Snell and his wife Lucile had three sons, Jud, John, and James. The latter, J. Laurie Snell, became a professor of mathematics at Dartmouth College. Jud and John found careers as a businessman and a United States Navy pilot respectively.

In 1938, Snell appeared on Edgar Guest's radio show "It Can Be Done". In 1941 he wrote a series of war stories for boys at the request of his publisher. He retired from writing soon after the end of the World War II. He spent much of his retirement at a summer cottage on Isle Royale, Michigan. Lucille, a concert pianist who had attended the New England Conservatory of Music, suffered from asthma, so the family vacationed in the north, at Hessel, Michigan, and then at Isle Royale. Here the family acquired a life-lease on a property at Tobin Harbor in Isle Royale National Park. Snell would visit schools in Detroit and Des Moines, lecturing with photographic slides showing life on Isle Royale.

Snell died in 1959 at the age of 80. He is buried in Wheaton Cemetery in Wheaton, Illinois.

== Works ==
- Little White Fox And His Arctic Friends (1916)
- An Eskimo Robinson Crusoe (1917)
- Captain Kituk (1918)
- Skimmer And His Thrilling Adventures (1919)
- Skimmer, The Daring, In The Far North (1919)
- Soolook, Wild Boy (c. 1920)
- Triple Spies (1920)
- Lost In The Air (1920)
- Panther Eye (1921)
- The Crimson Flash (1922)
- White Fire (1922)
- The Blue Envelope (1922)
- Curlie Carson Listens In [also written as: James Craig] (1922)
- On The Yukon Trail [written as: James Craig] (1922)
- The Black Schooner (1923)
- The Desert Patrol [written as: James Craig] (1923)
- The Dinner That Was Always There (1923)
- The Secret Mark (1923)
- The Seagoing Tank (1924)
- The Hidden Trail (1924)
- The Firebug (1925)
- The Flying Sub (1925)
- The Red Lure (1926)
- Dark Treasure (1926)
- The Silent Alarm (1926)
- Forbidden Cargoes (1927)
- Whispering Isles (1927)
- The Thirteenth Ring (1927)
- Johnny Longbow (1928)
- The Invisible Wall (1928)
- The Rope Of Gold (1929)
- The Gypsy Shawl (1929)
- The Arrow Of Fire (1930)
- The Gray Shadow (1931)
- The Riddle Of The Storm (1932)
- The Galloping Ghost (1933)
- The Phantom Violin (1934)
- Whispers At Dawn (1934)
- Mystery Wings (1935)
- Red Dynamite (1936)
- Seal Of Secrecy (1937)
- The Shadow Passes (1938)
- The Sign Of The Green Arrow (1939)
- The Ski Patrol (1940)
- Wings Over England (1941)
- Jane Withers And The Phantom Violin (1943)
- Jet Plane Mystery (1944)
- Destination Unknown (1944)
