= Gerald L. Thompson =

American mathematician

Gerald L. Thompson (born November 25, 1923, Rolfe, Iowa; died November 9, 2009 Pittsburgh, Pennsylvania) was the IBM Professor of Systems and Operations Research (Emeritus) in the Tepper School of Business of Carnegie Mellon University.

From 1943 to 1946, Thompson served in the Navy as an ensign on the USS Harwood (DD-861), which was stationed in the Pacific. By correspondence he obtained a Bachelor of Science degree from Iowa State University in 1944. After the war he attended Massachusetts Institute of Technology, graduating with Master of Science in 1948. He then took up further graduate study at University of Michigan, obtaining the Ph.D. in 1953 under the supervision of Robert M. Thrall.

In addition to being a mathematician, Thompson also was interested in painting. The illustration shown here is a study for "Chromatic Hamiltonian Knight's Tour". The painting combines Thompson's aesthetic and mathematical skills (the indicated moves of a knight on a chessboard cycle through the color wheel).

Thompson's students include Fred W. Glover.

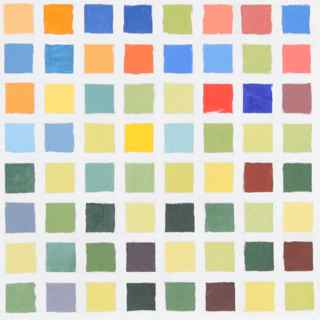
Study for "Chromatic Hamiltonian Knight's Tour". Gerald L. Thompson

== Dartmouth College ==
From 1953 to 1958, Thompson taught at Dartmouth College in Hanover, New Hampshire, where he wrote Introduction to Finite Mathematics with John G. Kemeny and J. Laurie Snell. Introduction to Finite Mathematics was "the first book which introduced mathematics into the study of management and business problems", according to Thompson's Carnegie-Mellon colleague, Professor Egon Balas. "Kemeny-Snell-Thompson" became a standard textbook in management science.

From 1958 to 1959, Thompson taught at Ohio Wesleyan University in Delaware, Ohio.

== Carnegie Mellon University ==
In 1959, Thompson joined the faculty of the Graduate School of Industrial Administration at the Carnegie Institute of Technology in Pittsburgh, Pennsylvania. At Carnegie Mellon University, Thompson became the IBM Professor of Systems and Operations Research and a Senior Researcher at the Innovation, Creativity, and Capital Institute. He developed new methods for mathematical and computational modeling and expanded the use of mathematics in management science and economics. His research encompassed mathematical programming, combinatorial optimization, production planning, large scale linear and network programming, computational economics, market games, optimal control theory, scheduling theory and practice, and management.

In 2001, Thompson retired from Carnegie Mellon University at the age of seventy-eight. In 2003, a conference was held to honor Thompson's 80th birthday. At this conference, William W. Cooper gave an address on Thompson's work and impact on operations research; Cooper's address was published in the festschrift for Thompson.

== Notable works ==
- Motzkin, T. S.; Raiffa, H.; Thompson, G. L.; Thrall, R. M. (1953). "The double description method". Contributions to the theory of games. Annals of Mathematics Studies. Vol. 2. Princeton, N. J.: Princeton University Press. pp. 51–73. MR 0060202.
- Kemeny, John G.; Snell, J. Laurie; Thompson, Gerald L. (1957). Introduction to finite mathematics. Englewood Cliffs, N. J.: Prentice-Hall, Inc. pp. xi+372. MR 0084454.
- Kemeny, John G.; Morgenstern, Oskar; Thompson, Gerald L. (1956). "A generalization of the von Neumann model of an expanding economy". Econometrica. Vol. 24. pp. 115–135. JSTOR 1905746. MR 0080573.
- Morgenstern, Oskar; Thompson, Gerald L. (1976). Mathematical theory of expanding and contracting economies. Lexington Books. Lexington, Massachusetts: D. C. Heath and Company. pp. xviii+277.
- Muth, John F.; Thompson, Gerald L., eds. (1963). Industrial scheduling. Prentice-Hall international series in management. Winters, Peter R. (collaborator). Englewood Cliffs, N.J.: Prentice-Hall.
- Thompson, Gerald L.; Thore, Sten (1992). Computational economics: Economic modeling with optimization software. Suite 1100, 651 Gateway Boulevard, South San Francisco, California, 94080–7014: Scientific Press. p. xii+352. ISBN 0-89426-201-7.
- Sethi, S. P.; Thompson, G. L. (2000). Optimal control theory: Applications to management science and economics (second ed.). New York, NY: Springer. ISBN 0-7923-8608-6.
- The column subtraction algorithm: An exact method for solving weighted set covering, packing and partitioning problems, Farid Harche, Gerald L. Thompson, Computers & OR 21(6): 689-705 (1994)

== Awards ==
- 2004 class of Fellows of the Institute for Operations Research and the Management Sciences
- The Chairman's Award for the Best Contributed Paper in Research, INFORMS Conference, Dallas, Texas - October 25–29, 1997
- Western Electric Award for Innovative Teaching, American Assembly of Collegiate Schools of Business - 1976
