= Bertil Näslund =

Swedish economist (1933–2016)

Bertil Näslund (4 April 1933 –15 February 2016) was a Swedish economist and emeritus professor at the Stockholm School of Economics. Näslund earned his PhD from Carnegie Mellon University where he was awarded the Alexander Henderson Award. His doctoral advisor was William W. Cooper. He was made a member of the Royal Swedish Academy of Engineering Sciences in 1977, of the Royal Swedish Academy of Sciences in 1990, and was a member of the Committee for the Nobel Memorial Prize in Economic Sciences from 1993 to 2001, chairing the committee in 1997 and 1998.

== See also ==
- Chance-constrained portfolio selection
