= Chance constrained programming =

Mathematical optimization approach

Chance constrained programming (CCP) is a mathematical optimization approach used to handle problems under uncertainty. It was first introduced by Charnes and Cooper in 1959 and further developed by Miller and Wagner in 1965. CCP is widely used in various fields, including finance, engineering, and operations research, to optimize decision-making processes where certain constraints need to be satisfied with a specified probability.

== Theoretical background ==
Chance constrained programming involves the use of probability and confidence levels to handle uncertainty in optimization problems. It distinguishes between single and joint chance constraints:

- Single chance constraints: These constraints ensure that each individual constraint is satisfied with a certain probability.
- Joint chance constraints: These constraints ensure that all constraints are satisfied simultaneously with a certain probability.

== Mathematical formulation ==
A general chance constrained optimization problem can be formulated as follows:

$\min f(x, u, \xi) \text{s.t. } g(x, u, \xi) = 0, \Pr\{ h(x, u, \xi) \geq 0 \} \geq \alpha$

Here, $f$ is the objective function, $g$ represents the equality constraints, $h$ represents the inequality constraints, $x$ represents the state variables, $u$ represents the control variables, $\xi$ represents the uncertain parameters, and $\alpha$ is the confidence level.

Common objective functions in CCP involve minimizing the expected value of a cost function, possibly combined with minimizing the variance of the cost function.

== Solution approaches ==
To solve CCP problems, the stochastic optimization problem is often relaxed into an equivalent deterministic problem. There are different approaches depending on the nature of the problem:

- Linear CCP: For linear systems, the feasible region is typically convex, and the problem can be solved using linear programming techniques.
- Nonlinear CCP: For nonlinear systems, the main challenge lies in computing the probabilities and their gradients. These problems often require nonlinear programming solvers.
- Dynamic systems: Dynamic systems involve time-dependent uncertainties, and the solution approach must account for the propagation of uncertainty over time.

== Practical applications ==
Chance constrained programming is used in engineering for process optimisation under uncertainty and production planning and in finance for portfolio selection. It has been applied to renewable energy integration, generating flight trajectory for UAVs, and robotic space exploration.

=== Process optimization under uncertainty ===
CCP is used in chemical and process engineering to optimize operations considering uncertainties in operating conditions and model parameters. For example, in optimizing the design and operation of chemical plants, CCP helps in achieving desired performance levels while accounting for uncertainties in feedstock quality, demand, and environmental conditions.

=== Production planning and operations ===
In production planning, CCP can optimize production schedules and resource allocation under demand uncertainty. A typical problem formulation involves maximizing profit while ensuring that production constraints are satisfied with a certain probability.

=== Chance-constrained portfolio selection ===
Chance-constrained portfolio selection is an approach to portfolio selection under loss aversion which is based on CCP. The goal is to maximize expected returns while ensuring that the portfolio's risk (e.g., variance or downside risk) stays within acceptable levels with a certain probability. This approach allows investors to consider the uncertainty in asset returns and make more informed investment decisions.
