= Network Data Envelopment Analysis =

Extension of Data Envelopent Analysis

Network Data Envelopment Analysis (Network DEA) is an advancement of the traditional Data Envelopment Analysis (DEA) methodology, designed to evaluate the efficiency of Decision-Making Units (DMUs) by accounting for their internal structures. Unlike classical DEA, which treats DMUs as "black boxes," Network DEA decomposes them into interconnected subsystems or stages, providing a more detailed and accurate assessment of their operations.

== Background ==
The conventional DEA models assume that DMUs operate as single-stage processes, ignoring the internal structures. These limitations gave rise to Network DEA, that extends traditional DEA by considering a DMUs as a system with sub-processes, i.e.,the DMUs are modeled as networks of interconnected stages, each with its own inputs, outputs, and intermediate products. An indicative example of such a DMU is a supply chain, which has a network structure and is composed of several members whose performances affect the overall performance of the supply chain.

Intermediate products are internal measures that simultaneously act as outputs of some stages and inputs of some others. Their treatment differentiates network DEA models from conventional DEA formulations.

In addition, the efficiency is assessed at both the system (overall DMU) and stage levels. The earliest network DEA formulations appeared in studies of multi-stage production systems. Initial models focused primarily on two-stage structures, while later works generalized to series, parallel, and dynamic network configurations.

Reviews and classifications of network DEA methods can be found in the literature.

== Overview ==
Network DEA extends traditional DEA by considering a DMUs as a system with sub-processes, i.e.,the DMUs are modeled as networks of interconnected stages, each with its own inputs, outputs, and intermediate products. Intermediate products are internal measures that simultaneously act as outputs of some stages and inputs of some others. Their treatment differentiates network DEA models from conventional DEA formulations. In addition, the efficiency is assessed at both the system (overall DMU) and stage levels.

The earliest network DEA formulations appeared in studies of multi-stage production systems. Initial models focused primarily on two-stage structures, while later works generalized to series, parallel, and dynamic network configurations.

Several reviews and classifications of network DEA methods have been published.

== Major Network DEA assessment paradigms ==
The following categorization of Network DEA assessment paradigms is made in:

- Efficiency Decomposition: The efficiency decomposition approach first evaluates the overall efficiency of the DMU and subsequently derives the efficiencies of the individual stages through a decomposition mechanism.
- Efficiency Composition: The composition approach evaluates the efficiencies of the individual stages first and then aggregates them to determine the overall system efficiency.
- Slack-Based Measures (SBM): The SBM approach simultaneously determines both stage and overall efficiencies by directly incorporating input and output slacks into the assessment mode.
- System-centric: The system-centric approach considers the internal structure and interdependencies of the subprocesses while providing only a single overall efficiency measure without explicitly estimating stage efficiencies.

== Applications ==
Network DEA has broad applicability in sectors where internal processes significantly impact performance, including:

- Supply Chains: Evaluating efficiency across multiple stages of production and distribution.
- Healthcare Systems: Analyzing hospitals or departments with interdependent operations
- Education: Assessing universities by decomposing activities such as teaching and research
- Energy Systems: Studying multi-stage energy production and distribution processes

== Limitations ==
Despite its advantages, Network DEA (NDEA) presents several limitations. The incorporation of internal structures substantially increases model complexity and computational burden, especially in generalized multi-stage or network configurations. In addition, several studies have noted that standard DEA projection mechanisms are not always directly applicable in two-stage or network settings because efficient frontier determination and projection consistency become more difficult when intermediate measures connect stages. Another important limitation concerns the treatment of returns to scale. In some NDEA formulations, the implementation of VRS is problematic. Finally, decomposition of overall efficiency into stage efficiencies may not always be unique, leading to ambiguity in the interpretation of divisional performance scores.
