= Henry Roy Brahana =

American mathematician

Henry Roy Brahana (16 August 1895 in Lowell, Vermont – 15 October 1972 in Dennis, Massachusetts) was a mathematician, specializing in metabelian groups and related geometric structures.

H. Roy Brahana received his PhD from Princeton University in 1920 under the direction of Oswald Veblen. In the autumn of 1920, he joined the mathematics department of the University of Illinois at Urbana-Champaign and remained there until his retirement in 1963. Brahana was the editor for the publication by the University of Illinois Press of the collected works of George Abram Miller in 5 volumes, coming out in the years 1935, 1939, 1946, 1955, and 1959. The H. Roy Brahana Prize for undergraduates at U. of Illinois at Urbana-Champaign was established in his honor. His doctoral students include Robert M. Thrall.

== Selected publications ==
- "Systems of circuits on two-dimensional manifolds." Annals of Mathematics (1921): 144–168. doi:10.2307/1968030
- "Regular maps on an anchor ring." American Journal of Mathematics 48, no. 4 (1926): 225–240. doi:10.2307/2370598
- "Regular maps and their groups." American Journal of Mathematics 49, no. 2 (1927): 268–284. doi:10.2307/2370756
