= Raf Souccar =

Canadian police officer and cannabis magnate

Raf Souccar OOM
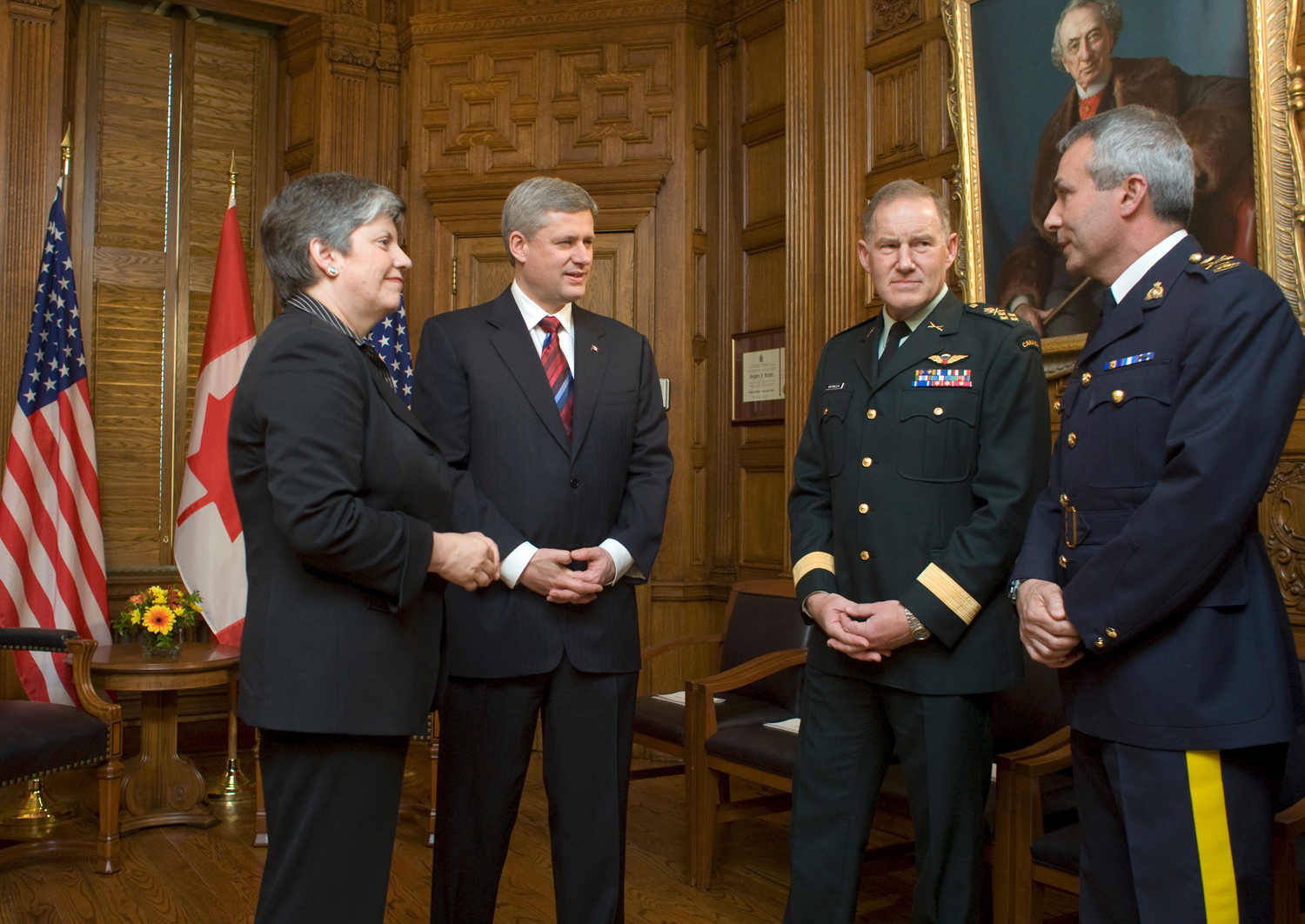
- Left to right: Janet Napolitano, Stephen Harper, Walter Natynczyk, and Raf Souccar, Ottawa. 2009.
- Born: 1956 or 1957
- Citizenship: Canada
- Occupation: Deputy Commissioner (retired)
- Employer: Royal Canadian Mounted Police
- Organization: Canadian Air Transport Security Authority
- Honours: Officer of the Order of Merit of the Police Forces

Raf Souccar OOM (born 1956 or 1957) is a Canadian former deputy police commissioner who lead the anti-drugs work of the Royal Canadian Mounted Police. After leaving the police force, Souccar launched and led a medical cannabis company.

Souccar has worked on the board of directors of the Canadian Air Transport Security Authority and advocates for better services for people who used opioids.

== Career ==
=== Police career ===
Souccar became a police officer in 1978 and in 2008 became the deputy commissioner of the Royal Canadian Mounted Police (RCMP), based in Ottawa. During his 35-year police career, Souccar worked as an undercover drug officer, and became the director-general of the police forces drugs and organized crime section. Souccar served on the Prime Minister's marijuana legalization task force. In 2011, after successfully collaborating with Insite on their safe drug injection site, Souccar declined to publicly support the program in a press release.

A photograph of Souccar's silhouette is featured in the emblem that appears on all RCMP police cars and he was awarded the Officer of the Order of Merit of the Police Forces by Canada's Governor General Michaëlle Jean on January 9, 2008.

Souccar was put on leave from the police in 2011 after accusing his supervisor, civilian commissioner Bill Elliott, of bullying and disrespectful behaviour.

=== Medical cannabis career ===
Souccar launched Aleafia Total Health Network a medical cannabis business, with former Ontario Provincial Police commissioner and politician Julian Fantino on November 14, 2017, eight months prior to the legalisation of recreational cannabis in Canada. Their business was located in a shopping mall in Vaughan. Souccar was the chief executive officer (CEO) and President of the company. After launching the cannabis business, politician Don Davies accused Souccar of having a conflict of interest.

During his time as CEO, Souccar oversaw the acquisition of Emblem Corporation, a cannabis producer. Souccar resigned from his role at the company on May 15, 2020.

=== Airport security ===
In 2017, Souccar was on the board of directors of the Canadian Air Transport Security Authority.

== Advocacy and personal life ==
Souccar has advocated that people addicted to opiates should be provided with housing, medical-grade heroin, and mental health services.

Souccar was aged 54 in 2011.

== See also ==
- Cannabis in Canada
- Legal history of cannabis in Canada
