= Frieda Granot =

Israeli-Canadian operations researcher

Frieda Silber Granot CM (Hebrew: פרידה גרנות) is a retired Israeli-Canadian operations researcher, dean emeritus of graduate studies, professor emeritus of commerce and business administration, and Advisory Council Professor of Management Science emeritus at the University of British Columbia. Her research publications have concerned network flow problems, integer programming, cooperative game theory, and supply chains.

== Education and career ==
Granot earned a bachelor's degree in mathematics in 1969 and a master's degree in computer science in 1971 from the Technion – Israel Institute of Technology. Next, she went to the University of Texas at Austin, where she earned an interdisciplinary doctorate in 1974 in business, mathematics, and computer science. Her dissertation, On Some Problems of Interval and Integer Interval Programming, was supervised by Abraham Charnes.

After postdoctoral research in Canada at Dalhousie University and the Centre de Recherches Mathématiques at the Université de Montréal, she joined the University of British Columbia as an assistant professor in 1976. She was promoted to associate professor in 1978 and full professor in 1984, and was named Advisory Council Professor of Management Science in 1986. She was dean of graduate studies from 1996 to 2006, and senior associate dean in the Sauder School of Business from 2006 to 2011.

== Recognition ==
Granot was elected as a Fellow of the Institute for Operations Research and the Management Sciences in 2008, "for educational and administrative leadership, and for contributions to optimization".

She was appointed to the Order of Canada in the 2008 Canadian honours as "a role model in postsecondary education and first female dean of the Faculty of Graduate Studies at the University of British Columbia".
