= Edgar Fruitier =

Canadian actor (1930–2024)

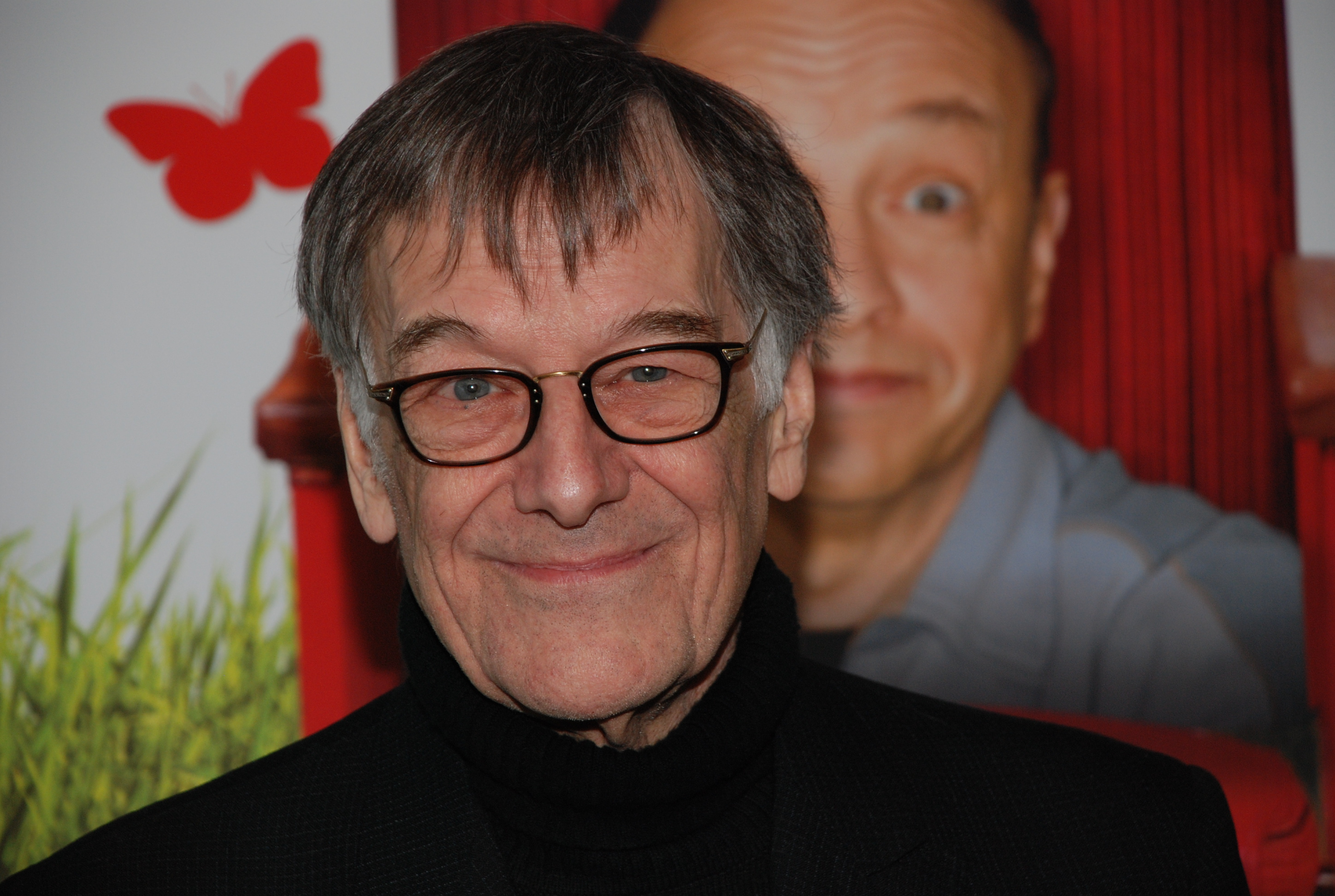
- Born: May 8, 1930; Montreal, Quebec
- Died: November 29, 2024 (aged 94); Montreal, Quebec
- Years active: 1953–2019
- Criminal charges: Sexual assault
- Awards: Dominion Drama Festival

Edgar Fruitier (/frˈuitiər/, May 8, 1930 – November 29, 2024) was a Canadian actor and comedian in Quebec. He began acting in the late 1950s, and was recognized for his works, notably for voicing Mr. Burns in the Quebec-French dubbed edition of The Simpsons.

In 2018, he was found guilty of sexual assault charges on a 16-year-old boy done in the 1970s. He was jailed in 2021, but was released a few weeks later.

== Early life ==
Edgar Fruitier was born on May 8, 1930, in Montreal, Quebec, and grew up in a household that was struggling from the Great Depression. His father, Émile Fruitier, was an academic who died when Edgar was two years old. Growing up, Edgar was interested in literature. He later studied theatre.

== Career ==
Edgar began his acting career in 1953. He played in the Canadian drama series La famille Plouffe. Edgar also acted in various plays throughout his career. He played in Le Roi David, where he won awards in the Dominion Drama Festival. In the 1980s, he began voicing Mr. Burns in the Quebec-French dubbed version of The Simpsons. He voice acted until 2019.

=== Sexual assault charges ===
In July 2018, Edgar was charged with sexual assault on a 16-year-old boy, Jean-René Tétreault, between 1974 and 1976. Edgar was found guilty in July 2020. He was jailed for three weeks as a result of this in August 2021.

== Personal life and death ==
Edgar spent the rest of his life in his home in Montreal, Quebec, where he was battling against Alzheimer's disease. Edgar died on November 29, 2024, in his home from cardiac arrest in his sleep. He was 94. A social media post was made later that day announcing Edgar's death.
