= Abraham Charnes =

American mathematician

- Born: September 3, 1917; Hopewell, Virginia, U.S.
- Died: December 19, 1992 (aged 75)
- Education: University of Illinois at Urbana-Champaign
- Awards: John von Neumann Theory Prize (1975)
- Scientific career
- Fields: Mathematics
- Workplaces: University of Texas at Austin
- Doctoral advisor: David Gordon Bourgin
- Doctoral students: Adi Ben-Israel; Frieda Granot; Carlton E. Lemke

Abraham Charnes (September 4, 1917 – December 19, 1992) was an American mathematician who worked in the area of operations research. Charnes published more than 200 research articles and seven books, including An Introduction to Linear Programming. His works influenced the development of Data envelopment analysis (DEA) method. In his 1953 article with William W. Cooper he developed the chance constrained programming method for solving optimization problems in the presence of uncertainty.

Charnes received his bachelor's degree in 1938, master's degree in 1939, and PhD degree (with the thesis Wing-Body Interaction in Linear Supersonic Flow) in 1947 from the University of Illinois. Charnes taught at the Carnegie Institute of Technology, Purdue University, Northwestern University, and at the University of Texas at Austin since 1968.

In 1975 Charnes was shortlisted for the Nobel Prize in economics. In 1982 he was awarded (jointly with William W. Cooper and Richard Duffin) the John von Neumann Theory Prize. In 1989 he received the Harold Larnder Prize of the Canadian Operations Research Society. In 2006 he received (jointly with William W. Cooper) the INFORMS Impact Prize. Charnes also received the Distinguished Public Service medal from the U.S. Navy for his contributions as a research physicist and operations analyst during World War II.

== See also ==
- Chance-constrained portfolio selection
