= William W. Cooper =

American operations researcher (1914-2012)

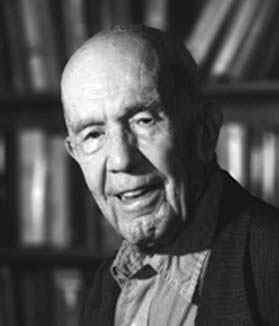
- Born: July 23, 1914; Birmingham, Alabama, US
- Died: June 20, 2012 (aged 97); Austin, Texas, US

Academic background
- Education: University of Chicago; Columbia University (attended)

Academic work
- Institutions: U.S. Bureau of the Budget; University of Chicago; Carnegie Mellon University; Harvard University; University of Texas at Austin
- Doctoral students: Andrew B. Whinston; Bertil Näslund; Edwardo Rhodes; Rajiv Banker

William Wager Cooper (July 23, 1914 – June 20, 2012) was an American operations researcher, known as a father of management science and as "Mr. Linear Programming". He was the founding president of The Institute of Management Sciences, founding editor-in-chief of Auditing: A Journal of Practice and Theory, a founding faculty member of the Graduate School of Industrial Administration at the Carnegie Institute of Technology (now the Tepper School of Business at Carnegie Mellon University), founding dean of the School of Urban and Public Affairs (now the Heinz College) at CMU, the former Arthur Lowes Dickinson Professor of Accounting at Harvard University, and the Foster Parker Professor Emeritus of Management, Finance and Accounting at the University of Texas at Austin.

== Biography ==
William Wager Cooper was born on July 23, 1914, in Birmingham, Alabama. He grew up in Chicago, where his father (a former bookkeeper) owned several gasoline stations that closed in the Great Depression. Cooper, in his second year of high school, dropped out to help support his family. He worked in a bowling alley, on a golf course, and as a professional boxer. As a boxer, he won 58 bouts, lost three, and drew two. While commuting to the golf course, he met Eric Kohler, a professor at Northwestern University, who pushed him to go back to school and bankrolled his entry to the University of Chicago. At Chicago, he began studying physical chemistry but was inspired by his work for Kohler on a legal case to switch to economics, graduating with a B.A. and Phi Beta Kappa honors in 1938.

After graduation, from 1938 to 1940, he worked as an accountant for the Tennessee Valley Authority, where Kohler had become Controller. There, he worked on performance auditing and the mathematical allocation of resources, and helped Kohler testify to a congressional investigative committee. In 1940, Cooper started doing graduate studies at Columbia University; however, in 1942, with his coursework completed but his thesis unwritten, he left Columbia to serve his country during World War II. He worked in the Division of Statistical Standards of the U.S. Bureau of the Budget coordinating the government programs that collected accounting statistics; his 1945 paper describing his wartime activities was the first recipient of an award from the American Institute of Accountants for the best paper of the year.

Cooper began his academic career with a brief teaching stint, from 1944 to 1946, back at the University of Chicago. In 1945, Cooper married his wife Ruth, a lawyer and human activist, and in 1946 he joined the newly formed Graduate School of Industrial Administration at the Carnegie Institute of Technology (now the Tepper School of Business at Carnegie Mellon University). There, he formed important research collaborations with Abraham Charnes, George Leland Bach, and Herbert A. Simon, and eventually became University Professor. While at CMU, from 1949 to 1950, he also worked again as an assistant to Eric Kohler, who had by this time become Comptroller of the Marshall Plan. In 1969 he left GSIA but stayed at CMU, becoming dean of the new School of Urban and Public Affairs (now the Heinz College) there. As dean, he realized that there would soon be a much greater role in American business management for African-Americans, and worked to increase African-American representation within the school.

In 1975, Harvard University hired Cooper away from CMU to become the Dickinson Professor of Accounting, and in 1980 he moved again, to the University of Texas at Austin, where he became the Foster Parker Professor of Management, Finance and Accounting. He retired in 1993, but continued to be active in research until his death on June 20, 2012.

== Professional activities ==
In the early 1950s, management science was a growing discipline that did not yet have a home society or journal in which its works could be published; the Operations Research Society of America had been formed, but concerned itself with somewhat different problems. At the invitation of Melvin E. Salveson, a group met at the University of California, Los Angeles in the summer of 1953, and again at Columbia University in December 1953, to form what became The Institute of Management Sciences. William Cooper's wife Ruth helped draft the Institute's charter; Cooper himself was elected as its first president, and Andrew Vázsonyi became its first past president (without previously having been president). ORSA and TIMS later merged in 1995 to form the Institute for Operations Research and the Management Sciences.

Cooper was the founding editor-in-chief of the journal Auditing: A Journal of Practice & Theory. The journal is published by the American Accounting Association; its first issue appeared in 1981.

He served as president of the Accounting Researchers International Association in 1986.

== Research ==
Cooper's research has been characterized both by its high volume and by the high diversity of its subjects, which fall into three major areas: economics, accounting, and management science and operations research. He wrote or co-authored more than 500 research articles and wrote or edited 27 books, including works on linear programming, non-linear programming, goal programming, least absolute deviations and fractional programming. In his 1959 article with Abraham Charnes he developed the chance constrained programming method for solving optimization problems in the presence of uncertainty.

His work moved business education from a largely anecdotal field towards greater interdisciplinarity and greater mathematical rigor. He made many innovations in the design of organizations, as well as applying mathematical optimization in such applications as the application of antidiscriminatory policies to the armed forces' management of personnel and to resource allocation in advertising campaigns.

His most celebrated publication is a 1978 paper with Abraham Charnes and Edwardo L. Rhodes inventing data envelopment analysis. This is a method for evaluating decision making units within an organization, by using imputed shadow prices. These prices are computed using a fractional program that is solved by reducing it to a linear program. The paper in which Cooper developed this method was included among 30 "most influential papers" in the European Journal of Operational Research. Another of Cooper's publications, a 1984 paper on production estimation co-authored with Rajiv Banker, has been one of the five most cited papers in Management Science. In 1982, with Abraham Charnes and Richard Duffin, Cooper won the John von Neumann Theory Prize of the Institute for Operations Research and the Management Sciences "for their fundamental contributions to optimization methods, concepts, and models for problems of decision, planning and design", covering work in "a multitude of fields including: linear programming and inequalities, goals and chance-constrained programming, geometric programming, infinite dimensional and convex programming, network modeling and analysis, fractional and interval programming, prediction and stochastic decision rules, and game theory." He also won the 1986 US Comptroller General Award for Significant Contributions to the US General Accounting Office and the Mehr Award of the American Risk and Insurance Association for his work on predicting insolvency.

Cooper was given four honorary degrees: an M.A. from Harvard University in 1976, and honorary doctorates from Ohio State University in 1970, Carnegie Mellon in 1982, and the University of Alicante in 1995. He was elected as a fellow of the Operations Research Society of America and of the Econometric Society in 1956, of the American Association for the Advancement of Science in 1963, of the Accounting Researchers International Association in 1976, and of INFORMS in 2002. At the University of Texas, as well as holding his named chair there, he was a Nadja Kozmetsky Scott Centennial Fellow, and a Janie Slaughter Briscoe Centennial Fellow.

In 1986, he served as the American Accounting Association's Distinguished International Visiting Professor in Latin America.

In 1990, he received the American Accounting Association's Outstanding Accounting Educator Award in 1990.

In 1993, Cooper was honored by a festschrift on the occasion of his 75th birthday.

In 2006, Cooper was inducted into the hall of fame of the International Federation of Operational Research Societies. He is also in the Accounting Hall of Fame maintained by the Ohio State University's Max M. Fisher College of Business.
