= List of financial performance measures =

This article comprises a list of measures of financial performance.

== Basic definitions ==
- Return on equity
- Return on assets
- Return on investment

== Return measures ==
- Arithmetic return: average return of different observation periods
- Geometric return: return depending only on start date and end date of one overall observation period
- Rate of return or return on investment
- Total shareholder return: annualized growth in capital assuming that dividends are reinvested

== Risk measures ==
- Risk measure
  - Distortion risk measure
  - Tail conditional expectation
  - Value at risk
  - Convex risk measure
    - Entropic risk measure
  - Coherent risk measure
    - Discounted maximum loss
    - Expected shortfall
    - Superhedging price
    - Spectral risk measure
- Deviation risk measure
  - Standard deviation or Variance
- Mid-range
  - Interdecile range
  - Interquartile range

== Risk-adjusted performance measures ==
- Calmar ratio
- Coefficient of variation
- Information ratio
- Jaws ratio
- Jensen's alpha
- Modigliani risk-adjusted performance
- Roy's safety-first criterion
- Sharpe ratio
- Sortino ratio
- Sterling ratio
- Treynor ratio
- Upside potential ratio
- V2 ratio
