= V2 ratio =

The V2 ratio (V2R) is a measure of excess return per unit of exposure to loss of an investment asset, portfolio or strategy, compared to a given benchmark.

The goal of the V2 ratio is to improve on existing and popular measures of risk-adjusted return, such as the Sharpe ratio, information ratio or Sterling ratio by taking into account the psychological impact of investment performances. The V2 ratio over-penalizes investments for which the investors had to go through bad returns comparatively to the market.

The V2R is calculated as:

$V^2_R = \frac{\big(\frac{V_n}{V_0}\big)^\frac{P}{n} - 1}{\sqrt{\frac{\sum_{i=0}^{n}{\big(\frac{V_i}{V_i^p}-1\big)^2}}{n}}+1}$

where $V_i$ is the ratio between the investment and the benchmark values at time $i$ (and $V_0$,$V_n$ the initial and final values respectively), $V_i^p$ the peak value ratio reached at time $i$, $n$ the number of periods and $P$ the number of identical periods in a year.

== History ==
The V2 ratio was created by Emmanuel Marot of quantitative trading company Zenvestment (previously 'Valu Valu', hence the 'V2' in the V2 Ratio) and first published in 2011 on SeekingAlpha.com.

== Rationale ==
Anchoring is a cognitive bias that shifts perception toward a reference point (the anchor). When evaluating an investment performance, people tend to continuously compare their returns with the stock market at large, or, more precisely, with the index commonly quoted by medias, such as the S&P 500 or the Dow Jones Industrial Average. To address this, the V2 ratio divides the excess return of an investment by the quadratic mean of the relative drawdowns. The relative drawdown compares the loss in value of the investment since its previous peak with the loss in value in the benchmark. For instance, if an asset is down 30% since its peak while the market at large is down by 25%, then the relative drawdown is only 5%. The perception of the poor performance of the asset is somehow mitigated by the overall loss of the market. Taking the ulcer index as a direct inspiration, the V2 ratio uses a quadratic mean of the relative drawdowns to over-penalize large swerves, as investors are more likely to liquidate the asset or abandon the strategy when facing such large relative losses.

== Properties ==
- The V2 ratio can always be calculated
- The V2 ratio of a benchmark with itself is zero
- An investment without any relative drawdowns has a V2 ratio equal to the annualized excess return

== See also ==
- Omega ratio
- Sharpe ratio
- Sortino ratio
- Treynor ratio
