= Treynor ratio =

Measure of financial risk

In finance, the Treynor reward-to-volatility model (sometimes called the reward-to-volatility ratio or Treynor measure), named after American economist Jack L. Treynor, is a measurement of the returns earned in excess of that which could have been earned on an investment that has no risk that can be diversified (e.g., Treasury bills or a completely diversified portfolio), per unit of market risk assumed.

The Treynor ratio relates excess return over the risk-free rate to the additional risk taken; however, systematic risk is used instead of total risk. The higher the Treynor ratio, the better the performance of the portfolio under analysis.

== Formula ==
$$T = \frac{r_i - r_f}{\beta_i},$$

where $T$ is the Treynor ratio, $r_i$ is the return of portfolio $i$, $r_f$ is the risk free rate, and $\beta_i$ is the beta of portfolio $i$.

== Example ==
Taking the equation detailed above, let us assume that the expected portfolio return is 20%, the risk free rate is 5%, and the beta of the portfolio is 1.5. Substituting these values, we get the following:
$$T = \frac{0.2 - 0.05}{1.5} = 0.1.$$

== Limitations ==
Like the Sharpe ratio, the Treynor ratio (T) does not quantify the value added, if any, of active portfolio management. It is a ranking criterion only. A ranking of portfolios based on the Treynor Ratio is only useful if the portfolios under consideration are sub-portfolios of a broader, fully diversified portfolio. If this is not the case, portfolios with identical systematic risk, but different total risk, will be rated the same. But the portfolio with a higher total risk is less diversified and therefore has a higher unsystematic risk which is not priced in the market.

An alternative method of ranking portfolio management is Jensen's alpha, which quantifies the added return as the excess return above the security market line in the capital asset pricing model. As these two methods both determine rankings based on systematic risk alone, they will rank portfolios identically.

== See also ==
- Bias ratio (finance)
- Hansen-Jagannathan bound
- Jensen's alpha
- Modern portfolio theory
- Modigliani risk-adjusted performance
- Omega ratio
- Sharpe ratio
- Sortino ratio
- Upside potential ratio
- V2 ratio
