= Risk-adjusted return on capital =

Profitability measurement framework

Risk-adjusted return on capital (RAROC) is a risk-based profitability measurement framework for analysing risk-adjusted financial performance and providing a consistent view of profitability across businesses. The concept was developed by Bankers Trust and principal designer Dan Borge in the late 1970s. Note, however, that increasingly return on risk-adjusted capital (RORAC) is used as a measure, whereby the risk adjustment of Capital is based on the capital adequacy guidelines as outlined by the Basel Committee.

== Basic formula ==
The formula is given by

$$\mbox{RAROC} = {\mbox{Expected return} \over \mbox{Economic capital}}
= {\mbox{Expected return} \over \mbox{Value at risk}}$$

Broadly speaking, in business enterprises, risk is traded off against benefit. RAROC is defined as the ratio of risk adjusted return to economic capital. The economic capital is the amount of money which is needed to secure the survival in a worst-case scenario, it is a buffer against unexpected shocks in market values. Economic capital is a function of market risk, credit risk, and operational risk, and is often calculated by VaR. This use of capital based on risk improves the capital allocation across different functional areas of banks, insurance companies, or any business in which capital is placed at risk for an expected return above the risk-free rate.

RAROC system allocates capital for two basic reasons:

1. Risk management
2. Performance evaluation

For risk management purposes, the main goal of allocating capital to individual business units is to determine the bank's optimal capital structure—that is economic capital allocation is closely correlated with individual business risk. As a performance evaluation tool, it allows banks to assign capital to business units based on the economic value added of each unit.

== Decision measures based on regulatory and economic capital ==
With the 2008 financial crisis, and the introduction of Dodd–Frank Act, and Basel III, the minimum required regulatory capital requirements have become onerous. An implication of stringent regulatory capital requirements spurred debates on the validity of required economic capital in managing an organization's portfolio composition, highlighting that constraining requirements should have organizations focus entirely on the return on regulatory capital in measuring profitability and in guiding portfolio composition. The counterargument highlights that concentration and diversification effects should play a prominent role in portfolio selection – dynamics recognized in economic capital, but not regulatory capital.

It did not take long for the industry to recognize the relevance and importance of both regulatory and economic measures, and eschewed focusing exclusively on one or the other. Relatively simple rules were devised to have both regulatory and economic capital enter into the process. In 2012, researchers at Moody's Analytics designed a formal extension to the RAROC model that accounts for regulatory capital requirements as well as economic risks. In the framework, capital allocation can be represented as a composite capital measure (CCM) that is a weighted combination of economic and regulatory capital – with the weight on regulatory capital determined by the degree to which an organization is a capital constrained.

== See also ==
- Enterprise risk management
- Financial risk management § Banking
- Omega ratio
- Risk return ratio
- Risk-return spectrum
- Sharpe ratio
- Sortino ratio
