= Sterling ratio =

The Sterling ratio (SR) is a measure of the risk-adjusted return of an investment portfolio.

While multiple definitions of the Sterling ratio exist, it measures return over average drawdown, versus the more commonly used max drawdown. While the max drawdown looks back over the entire period and takes the worst point along that equity curve, a quick change of the look back allows one to see what the worst peak to valley loss was for each calendar year as well. From there, the drawdowns of each year are averaged to come up with an average annual drawdown. The original definition was most likely suggested by Deane Sterling Jones (a company no longer in existence):

$$SR=\frac{Compound ROR}{ABS(Avg.Annual DD -10\%)}$$

If the drawdown is put in as a negative number, then subtract the 10%, and then multiply the whole thing by a negative to result in a positive ratio. If the drawdown is put in as a positive number, then add 10% and the result is the same positive ratio.

To clarify the reason, he (Deane Sterling Jones) used 10% in the denominator was to compare any investment with a return stream to a risk-free investment (T-bills). He invented the ratio in 1981 when T-bills were yielding 10%. Since bills did not experience drawdowns (and a ratio of 1.0 at that time), he felt that any investment with a ratio greater than 1.0 had a better risk/reward tradeoff. The average drawdown was always averaged and entered as a positive number and then 10% was added to that value.

This version of the Sterling ratio may be adjusted to something more like a Sharpe ratio as follows:

$$SR=\frac{Annual\ Portfolio\ Return - Annual\ Risk\operatorname{-}Free\ Rate}{Average\ Largest\ Drawdown}$$

== See also ==
- Risk return ratio
- Sortino ratio
