= Information coefficient =

Measure of prediction's merit in finance

The information coefficient (IC) is a measure of the merit of a predicted value. In finance, the information coefficient is used as a performance metric for the predictive skill of a financial analyst. The information coefficient is close to correlation in that it can be seen to measure the linear relationship between two random variables, e.g. predicted stock returns and the actualized returns. The information coefficient ranges from -1 to 1, with 0 denoting no linear relationship between predictions and actual values (poor forecasting skills) and 1 denoting a perfect linear relationship (good forecasting skills). Similarly, -1 reflects a negative linear relationship, i.e. the analyst always fails to make an accurate prediction.

== See also ==
- Information ratio
