= Betavexity =

In investment analysis, betavexity is a form of convexity that is specific to the beta coefficient of a long tailed investment (i.e. mortality risk). It is similar in nature to bond convexity or gamma that are exhibited in financial products such as bonds or options but is specific to portfolios replicating indices of shorter maturities.

== Investment horizon ==
Certain investors such as insurance companies have longer-term investment horizons than hedge funds, which allow for investments in assets that have longer maturities. As a result, these investors can invest in assets that have an inherent return component linked to the dynamic of the term of the investment.
