= Jaws ratio =

Financial ratio

The jaws ratio is a measure used in finance to demonstrate the extent to which a trading entity's income growth rate exceeds its expenses growth rate, measured as a percentage. A larger positive value demonstrates that a trading entity is effectively generating more income over time than it is generating expenses, thereby potentially increasing its profitability, and profitability growth rate. The ratio may also be a negative percentage, which should be a cause for concern for the owners/management of a trading entity as this will over time result in eroded profitability. The ratio is so named because, when these rates are graphed, the space between the lines resembles a pair of jaws.

Strictly speaking, the jaws ratio is not a true ratio in that the calculation is not expressed as one number divided by another, and is calculated as follows:

Jaws ratio = (Income Growth Rate) − (Expense Growth Rate). The jaws ratio is calculated by subtracting the expense growth rate from the income growth rate.
