= Risk-free rate =

Hypothetical interest rate on a risk-free investment

The risk-free rate of return, usually shortened to the risk-free rate, is the rate of return of a hypothetical investment with scheduled payments over a fixed period of time that is assumed to meet all payment obligations.

Since the risk-free rate can be obtained with no risk, any other investment having some risk will have to have a higher rate of return in order to induce any investors to hold it.

In practice, to infer the risk-free interest rate in a particular currency, market participants often choose the yield to maturity on a risk-free bond issued by a government of the same currency whose risks of default are so low as to be negligible. For example, the rate of return on zero-coupon Treasury bonds (T-bills) is sometimes seen as the risk-free rate of return in US dollars.

== Theoretical measurement ==
As stated by Malcolm Kemp in chapter five of his book Market Consistency: Model Calibration in Imperfect Markets, the risk-free rate means different things to different people and there is no consensus on how to go about a direct measurement of it.

One interpretation of the theoretical risk-free rate is aligned to Irving Fisher's concept of inflationary expectations, described in his treatise The Theory of Interest (1930), which is based on the theoretical costs and benefits of holding currency. In Fisher's model, these are described by two potentially offsetting movements:

1. Expected increases in the money supply should result in investors preferring current consumption to future income.
2. Expected increases in productivity should result in investors preferring future income to current consumption.

The correct interpretation is that the risk-free rate could be either positive or negative and in practice the sign of the expected risk-free rate is an institutional convention – this is analogous to the argument that Tobin makes on page 17 of his book Money, Credit and Capital. In a system with endogenous money creation and where production decisions and outcomes are decentralized and potentially intractable to forecasting, this analysis provides support to the concept that the risk-free rate may not be directly observable.

However, it is commonly observed that for people applying this interpretation, the value of supplying currency is normally perceived as being positive. It is not clear what is the true basis for this perception, but it may be related to the practical necessity of some form of (credit?) currency to support the specialization of labour, the perceived benefits of which were detailed by Adam Smith in The Wealth of Nations. However, Smith did not provide an 'upper limit' to the desirable level of the specialization of labour and did not fully address issues of how this should be organised at the national or international level.

An alternative (less well developed) interpretation is that the risk-free rate represents the time preference of a representative worker for a representative basket of consumption. Again, there are reasons to believe that in this situation the risk-free rate may not be directly observable.

A third (also less well developed) interpretation is that instead of maintaining pace with purchasing power, a representative investor may require a risk free investment to keep pace with wages.

Given the theoretical 'fog' around this issue, in practice most industry practitioners rely on some form of proxy for the risk-free rate, or use other forms of benchmark rate which are presupposed to incorporate the risk-free rate plus some risk of default. However, there are also issues with this approach, which are discussed in the next section.

Further discussions on the concept of a 'stochastic discount rate' are available in The Econometrics of Financial Markets by Campbell, Lo and MacKinley.

== Proxies for the risk-free rate ==
EURIBOR is used as a proxy for the risk-free rate in European contexts. Euribor-12m (red), 3m (blue), 1w (green) value

The return on domestically held short-term government bonds is normally perceived as a good proxy for the risk-free rate. In business valuation the long-term yield on the US Treasury coupon bonds is generally used as the risk-free rate of return. However, theoretically this is only correct if there is no risk of default associated with the bond. Government bonds are usually considered to have a very low risk of default, because they are denominated in the domestic currency, which the government can create more of ("print"). (Note: Governments sometimes issue debt in a foreign currency, or a currency they do not control. During the Greek government-debt crisis, yields on 10-year Greek government bonds increased from less than 5% in September 2009 to 32.6 percent in February 2012. Greece had joined the Euro and could not print its own currency. By comparison, at this time, Coca-Cola Hellenic's long-term debt was rated investment grade and yielded less than 5%.) However, default on government debt does in fact happen.

Default risk is not the only risk. Other risks include interest rate risk, currency risk, and inflation risk. As interest rates change, the value of the bond will change, particularly for long-term bonds; and for coupon-bearing bonds, the return on the reinvested coupons will change. For investors holding bonds of foreign governments, the value of the bond will fluctuate with changing exchange rates. Foreign investors will demand a premium to compensate for this risk. Finally, investors demand a premium for expected inflation, but if inflation is higher than expected, the real value of the bond will fall more than expected.

Some academics support the use of swap rates as a measurement of the risk-free rate. Feldhütter and Lando state that: "the riskless rate is better proxied by the swap rate than the Treasury rate for all maturities."

Another possibility used to estimate the risk-free rate is the inter-bank lending rate. This appears to be premised on the basis that these institutions benefit from an implicit guarantee, underpinned by the role of the monetary authorities as 'the lendor of last resort.' (Note: In a system with an endogenous money supply the 'monetary authorities' may be private agents as well as the central bank.) Again, the same observation applies to banks as a proxy for the risk-free rate – if there is any perceived risk of default implicit in the interbank lending rate, it is not appropriate to use this rate as a proxy for the risk-free rate.

Similar conclusions can be drawn from other potential benchmark rates, including AAA-rated corporate bonds of institutions deemed 'too big to fail.'

== Application ==
The risk-free interest rate is highly significant in the context of the general application of capital asset pricing model which is based on the modern portfolio theory. There are numerous issues with this model, the most basic of which is the reduction of the description of utility of stock holding to the expected mean and variance of the returns of the portfolio. In reality, there may be other utility of stock holding.

The risk-free rate is also a required input in financial calculations, such as the Black–Scholes formula for pricing stock options and the Sharpe ratio. Note that some finance and economic theories assume that market participants can borrow at the risk-free rate; in practice, very few (if any) borrowers have access to finance at the risk free rate.

The risk-free rate of return is the key input into cost of capital calculations such as those performed using the capital asset pricing model. The cost of capital at risk then is the sum of the risk-free rate of return and certain risk premia.

== See also ==
- Short-rate model
- Capital asset pricing model
- Beta (finance)
- Interest-free economy
