= Risk metric =

In the context of risk measurement, a risk metric is the concept quantified by a risk measure. When choosing a risk metric, an agent is picking an aspect of perceived risk to investigate, such as volatility or probability of default.

== Risk measure and risk metric ==
In a general sense, a measure is a procedure for quantifying something. A metric is that which is being quantified. In other words, the method or formula to calculate a risk metric is called a risk measure.

For example, in finance, the volatility of a stock might be calculated in any one of the three following ways:

- Calculate the sample standard deviation of the stock's returns over the past 30 trading days.
- Calculate the sample standard deviation of the stock's returns over the past 100 trading days.
- Calculate the implied volatility of the stock from some specified call option on the stock.

These are three distinct risk measures. Each could be used to measure the single risk metric volatility.

== Examples ==
- Deaths per passenger mile (transportation)
- Probability of failure (systems reliability)
- Volatility (finance)
- Delta (finance)
- Value at risk (finance/actuarial)
- Probability of default (finance/actuarial)

== Selection criteria ==
The choice of risk metric depends on the type of uncertainty being analysed and the decision the assessment is intended to support. Risk is commonly expressed in terms of risk sources, potential events, consequences, and likelihood, so a selected metric may focus on the probability of an event, the magnitude of its consequences, or a combination of both.

In operational and information-security risk assessment, risk metrics are often selected to support prioritisation and response decisions. The National Institute of Standards and Technology describes risk as typically being a function of the adverse impact that would result from a circumstance or event and the likelihood of occurrence. Metrics such as likelihood, impact, probability of failure, or value at risk therefore reflect different aspects of risk rather than interchangeable measurements of the same concept.

== See also ==
- Risk measure
- Coherent risk measure
- Deviation risk measure
- Spectral risk measure
- Distortion risk measure
