= G-expectation =

In probability theory, the g-expectation is a nonlinear expectation based on a backwards stochastic differential equation (BSDE) originally developed by Shige Peng.

== Definition ==
Given a probability space $(\Omega,\mathcal{F},\mathbb{P})$ with $(W_t)_{t \geq 0}$ is a (d-dimensional) Wiener process (on that space). Given the filtration generated by $(W_t)$, i.e. $\mathcal{F}_t = \sigma(W_s: s \in [0,t])$, let $X$ be $\mathcal{F}_T$ measurable. Consider the BSDE given by:

$$\begin{align}dY_t &= g(t,Y_t,Z_t) \, dt - Z_t \, dW_t\\ Y_T &= X\end{align}$$

Then the g-expectation for $X$ is given by $\mathbb{E}^g[X] := Y_0$. Note that if $X$ is an m-dimensional vector, then $Y_t$ (for each time $t$) is an m-dimensional vector and $Z_t$ is an $m \times d$ matrix.

In fact the conditional expectation is given by $\mathbb{E}^g[X \mid \mathcal{F}_t] := Y_t$ and much like the formal definition for conditional expectation it follows that $\mathbb{E}^g[1_A \mathbb{E}^g[X \mid \mathcal{F}_t]] = \mathbb{E}^g[1_A X]$ for any $A \in \mathcal{F}_t$ (and the $1$ function is the indicator function).

== Existence and uniqueness ==
Let $g: [0,T] \times \mathbb{R}^m \times \mathbb{R}^{m \times d} \to \mathbb{R}^m$ satisfy:

1. $g(\cdot,y,z)$ is an $\mathcal{F}_t$-adapted process for every $(y,z) \in \mathbb{R}^m \times \mathbb{R}^{m \times d}$
2. $\int_0^T |g(t,0,0)| \, dt \in L^2(\Omega,\mathcal{F}_T,\mathbb{P})$ the L2 space (where $| \cdot |$ is a norm in $\mathbb{R}^m$)
3. $g$ is Lipschitz continuous in $(y,z)$, i.e. for every $y_1,y_2 \in \mathbb{R}^m$ and $z_1,z_2 \in \mathbb{R}^{m \times d}$ it follows that $|g(t,y_1,z_1) - g(t,y_2,z_2)| \leq C (|y_1 - y_2| + |z_1 - z_2|)$ for some constant $C$

Then for any random variable $X \in L^2(\Omega,\mathcal{F}_t,\mathbb{P};\mathbb{R}^m)$ there exists a unique pair of $\mathcal{F}_t$-adapted processes $(Y,Z)$ which satisfy the stochastic differential equation.

In particular, if $g$ additionally satisfies:

1. $g$ is continuous in time ($t$)
2. $g(t,y,0) \equiv 0$ for all $(t,y) \in [0,T] \times \mathbb{R}^m$

then for the terminal random variable $X \in L^2(\Omega,\mathcal{F}_t,\mathbb{P};\mathbb{R}^m)$ it follows that the solution processes $(Y,Z)$ are square integrable. Therefore $\mathbb{E}^g[X | \mathcal{F}_t]$ is square integrable for all times $t$.

== See also ==
- Expected value
- Choquet expectation
- Risk measure – almost any time consistent convex risk measure can be written as $\rho_g(X) := \mathbb{E}^g[-X]$
