= Deviation risk measure =

Risk metric quantifying variability of returns around their expected value

In financial mathematics, a deviation risk measure is a function to quantify financial risk (and not necessarily downside risk) in a different method than a general risk measure. Deviation risk measures generalize the concept of standard deviation.

== Mathematical definition ==
A function $D: \mathcal{L}^2 \to [0,+\infty]$, where $\mathcal{L}^2$ is the L2 space of random variables (random portfolio returns), is a deviation risk measure if

1. Shift-invariant: $D(X + r) = D(X)$ for any $r \in \mathbb{R}$
2. Normalization: $D(0) = 0$
3. Positively homogeneous: $D(\lambda X) = \lambda D(X)$ for any $X \in \mathcal{L}^2$ and $\lambda > 0$
4. Sublinearity: $D(X + Y) \leq D(X) + D(Y)$ for any $X, Y \in \mathcal{L}^2$
5. Positivity: $D(X) > 0$ for all nonconstant X, and $D(X) = 0$ for any constant X.

== Relation to risk measure ==
There is a one-to-one relationship between a deviation risk measure D and an expectation-bounded risk measure R where for any $X \in \mathcal{L}^2$

- $D(X) = R(X - \mathbb{E}[X])$
- $R(X) = D(X) - \mathbb{E}[X]$.

R is expectation bounded if $R(X) > \mathbb{E}[-X]$ for any nonconstant X and $R(X) = \mathbb{E}[-X]$ for any constant X.

If $D(X) < \mathbb{E}[X] - \operatorname{ess\inf} X$ for every X (where $\operatorname{ess\inf}$ is the essential infimum), then there is a relationship between D and a coherent risk measure.

== Examples ==
The most well-known examples of risk deviation measures are:

- Standard deviation $\sigma(X)=\sqrt{E[(X-EX)^2]}$;
- Average absolute deviation $MAD(X)=E(|X-EX|)$;
- Lower and upper semi-deviations $\sigma_-(X)=\sqrt{{E[(X-EX)_-}^2]}$ and $\sigma_+(X)=\sqrt{{E[(X-EX)_+}^2]}$, where $[X]_-:=\max\{0,-X\}$ and $[X]_+:=\max\{0,X\}$;
- Range-based deviations, for example, $D(X)=EX-\inf X$ and $D(X)=\sup X-\inf X$;
- Conditional value-at-risk (CVaR) deviation, defined for any $\alpha\in(0,1)$ by ${\rm CVaR}_\alpha^\Delta(X)\equiv ES_\alpha (X-EX)$, where $ES_\alpha(X)$ is Expected shortfall.

== See also ==
- Unitized risk – Statistical parameter
