= Indifference price =

In finance, indifference pricing is a method of pricing financial securities with regard to a utility function. The indifference price is also known as the reservation price or private valuation. In particular, the indifference price is the price at which an agent would have the same expected utility level by exercising a financial transaction as by not doing so (with optimal trading otherwise). Typically the indifference price is a pricing range (a bid–ask spread) for a specific agent; this price range is an example of good-deal bounds.

== Mathematics ==
Given a utility function $u$ and a claim $C_T$ with known payoffs at some terminal time $T,$ let the function $V: \mathbb{R} \times \mathbb{R} \to \mathbb{R}$ be defined by

$$V(x,k) = \sup_{X_T \in \mathcal{A}(x)} \mathbb{E}\left[u\left(X_T + k C_T\right)\right]$$,

where $x$ is the initial endowment, $\mathcal{A}(x)$ is the set of all self-financing portfolios at time $T$ starting with endowment $x$, and $k$ is the number of the claim to be purchased (or sold). Then the indifference bid price $v^b(k)$ for $k$ units of $C_T$ is the solution of $V(x - v^b(k),k) = V(x,0)$ and the indifference ask price $v^a(k)$ is the solution of $V(x + v^a(k),-k) = V(x,0)$. The indifference price bound is the range $\left[v^b(k),v^a(k)\right]$.

== Example ==
Consider a market with a risk free asset $B$ with $B_0 = 100$ and $B_T = 110$, and a risky asset $S$ with $S_0 = 100$ and $S_T \in \{90, 110, 130\}$ each with probability $1/3$. Let your utility function be given by $u(x) = 1 - \exp(-x/10)$. To find either the bid or ask indifference price for a single European call option with strike 110, first calculate $V(x,0)$.

$V(x,0) = \max_{\alpha B_0 + \beta S_0 = x} \mathbb{E}[1 - \exp(-.1 \times (\alpha B_T + \beta S_T))]$

$$= \max_{\beta} \left[1 - \frac{1}{3} \left[\exp\left(-\frac{1.10 x - 20 \beta}{10}\right) + \exp\left(-\frac{1.10 x}{10}\right) + \exp\left(-\frac{1.10 x + 20 \beta}{10}\right)\right]\right]$$.

Which is maximized when $\beta = 0$, therefore $V(x,0) = 1 - \exp\left(-\frac{1.10 x}{10}\right)$.

Now to find the indifference bid price solve for $V(x - v^b(1),1)$

$V(x - v^b(1),1) = \max_{\alpha B_0 + \beta S_0 = x - v^b(1)} \mathbb{E}[1 - \exp(-.1 \times (\alpha B_T + \beta S_T + C_T))]$

$$= \max_{\beta} \left[1 - \frac{1}{3}\left[\exp\left(-\frac{1.10 (x - v^b(1)) - 20 \beta}{10}\right) + \exp\left(-\frac{1.10 (x - v^b(1))}{10}\right) + \exp\left(-\frac{1.10 (x - v^b(1)) + 20 \beta + 20}{10}\right)\right]\right]$$

Which is maximized when $\beta = -\frac{1}{2}$, therefore $V(x - v^b(1),1) = 1 - \frac{1}{3} \exp(-1.10 x/10) \exp(1.10 v^b(1)/10)\left[1 + 2 \exp(-1)\right]$.

Therefore $V(x,0) = V(x - v^b(1),1)$ when $v^b(1) = \frac{10}{1.1} \log\left(\frac{3}{1+2 \exp(-1)}\right) \approx 4.97$.

Similarly solve for $v^a(1)$ to find the indifference ask price.

== See also ==
- Willingness to pay
- Willingness to accept

== Notes ==
- If $\left[v^b(k),v^a(k)\right]$ are the indifference price bounds for a claim then by definition $v^b(k) = -v^a(-k)$.
- If $v(k)$ is the indifference bid price for a claim and $v^{sup}(k),v^{sub}(k)$ are the superhedging price and subhedging prices respectively then $v^{sub}(k) \leq v(k) \leq v^{sup}(k)$. Therefore, in a complete market the indifference price is always equal to the price to hedge the claim.
