= No-arbitrage bounds =

Concept in financial mathematics

In financial mathematics, no-arbitrage bounds are mathematical relationships specifying limits on financial portfolio prices. These price bounds are a specific example of good–deal bounds, and are in fact the greatest extremes for good–deal bounds.

The most frequent nontrivial example of no-arbitrage bounds is put–call parity for option prices. In incomplete markets, the bounds are given by the subhedging and superhedging prices.

The essence of no-arbitrage in mathematical finance is excluding the possibility of "making money out of nothing" in the financial market. This is necessary because the existence of persistent risk free arbitrage opportunities is not only unrealistic, but also contradicts the possibility of an economic equilibrium. All mathematical models of financial markets have to satisfy a no-arbitrage condition to be realistic models.

== See also ==
- Arbitrage § Arbitrage equilibrium
- Box spread
- Indifference price
