= Distortion risk measure =

Risk measure derived by applying a distortion function to a loss distribution

In financial mathematics and economics, a distortion risk measure is a type of risk measure which is related to the cumulative distribution function of the return of a financial portfolio.

== Mathematical definition ==
The function $\rho_g: L^p \to \mathbb{R}$ associated with the distortion function $g: [0,1] \to [0,1]$ is a distortion risk measure if for any random variable of gains $X \in L^p$ (where $L^p$ is the L^{p} space) then

$$\rho_g(X) = -\int_0^1 F_{-X}^{-1}(p) d\tilde{g}(p) = \int_{-\infty}^0 \tilde{g}(F_{-X}(x))dx - \int_0^{\infty} g(1 - F_{-X}(x)) dx$$

where $F_{-X}$ is the cumulative distribution function for $-X$ and $\tilde{g}$ is the dual distortion function $\tilde{g}(u) = 1 - g(1-u)$.

If $X \leq 0$ almost surely then $\rho_g$ is given by the Choquet integral, i.e. $\rho_g(X) = -\int_0^{\infty} g(1 - F_{-X}(x)) dx.$ Equivalently, $\rho_g(X) = \mathbb{E}^{\mathbb{Q}}[-X]$ such that $\mathbb{Q}$ is the monotone and normalized set function generated by $g$, i.e. for any $A \in \mathcal{F}$ the sigma-algebra then $\mathbb{Q}(A) = g(\mathbb{P}(A))$.

=== Properties ===
In addition to the properties of general risk measures, distortion risk measures also have:

1. Law invariant: If the distribution of $X$ and $Y$ are the same then $\rho_g(X) = \rho_g(Y)$.
2. Monotone with respect to first order stochastic dominance.
  1. If $g$ is a concave distortion function, then $\rho_g$ is monotone with respect to second order stochastic dominance.
3. $g$ is a concave distortion function if and only if $\rho_g$ is a coherent risk measure.

== Examples ==
- Value at risk is a distortion risk measure with associated distortion function
  $$g(x) = \begin{cases}0 & \text{if }0 \leq x < 1-\alpha\\ 1 & \text{if }1-\alpha \leq x \leq 1\end{cases}.$$
- Conditional value at risk is a distortion risk measure with associated distortion function
  $$g(x) = \begin{cases}\frac{x}{1-\alpha} & \text{if }0 \leq x < 1-\alpha\\ 1 & \text{if }1-\alpha \leq x \leq 1\end{cases}.$$
- The negative expectation is a distortion risk measure with associated distortion function $g(x) = x$.

== See also ==
- Risk measure
- Coherent risk measure
- Deviation risk measure
- Spectral risk measure
