= Good–deal bounds =

Good–deal bounds are price bounds for a financial portfolio which depends on an individual trader's preferences. Mathematically, if $A$ is a set of portfolios with future outcomes which are "acceptable" to the trader, then define the function $\rho: \mathcal{L}^p \to \mathbb{R}$ by

$$\rho(X) = \inf\left\{t \in \mathbb{R}: \exists V_T \in A_T: X + t + V_T \in A\right\} = \inf\left\{t \in \mathbb{R}: X + t \in A - A_T\right\}$$

where $A_T$ is the set of final values for self-financing trading strategies. Then any price in the range $(-\rho(X), \rho(-X))$ does not provide a good deal for this trader, and this range is called the "no good-deal price bounds."

If $A = \left\{Z \in \mathcal{L}^0: Z \geq 0 \; \mathbb{P}-a.s.\right\}$ then the good-deal price bounds are the no-arbitrage price bounds, and correspond to the subhedging and superhedging prices. The no-arbitrage bounds are the greatest extremes that good-deal bounds can take.

If $A = \left\{Z \in \mathcal{L}^0: \mathbb{E}[u(Z)] \geq \mathbb{E}[u(0)]\right\}$ where $u$ is a utility function, then the good-deal price bounds correspond to the indifference price bounds.
