= Dynamic risk measure =

In financial mathematics, a conditional risk measure is a random variable of the financial risk (particularly the downside risk) as if measured at some point in the future. A risk measure can be thought of as a conditional risk measure on the trivial sigma algebra.

A dynamic risk measure is a risk measure that deals with the question of how evaluations of risk at different times are related. It can be interpreted as a sequence of conditional risk measures.

A different approach to dynamic risk measurement has been suggested by Novak.

== Conditional risk measure ==
Consider a portfolio's returns at some terminal time $T$ as a random variable that is uniformly bounded, i.e., $X \in L^{\infty}\left(\mathcal{F}_T\right)$ denotes the payoff of a portfolio. A mapping $\rho_t: L^{\infty}\left(\mathcal{F}_T\right) \rightarrow L^{\infty}_t = L^{\infty}\left(\mathcal{F}_t\right)$ is a conditional risk measure if it has the following properties for random portfolio returns $X,Y \in L^{\infty}\left(\mathcal{F}_T\right)$:

Conditional cash invariance
$\forall m_t \in L^{\infty}_t: \; \rho_t(X + m_t) = \rho_t(X) - m_t$

Monotonicity
$\mathrm{If} \; X \leq Y \; \mathrm{then} \; \rho_t(X) \geq \rho_t(Y)$

Normalization
$\rho_t(0) = 0$

If it is a conditional convex risk measure then it will also have the property:

Conditional convexity
$\forall \lambda \in L^{\infty}_t, 0 \leq \lambda \leq 1: \rho_t(\lambda X + (1-\lambda) Y) \leq \lambda \rho_t(X) + (1-\lambda) \rho_t(Y)$

A conditional coherent risk measure is a conditional convex risk measure that additionally satisfies:

Conditional positive homogeneity
$\forall \lambda \in L^{\infty}_t, \lambda \geq 0: \rho_t(\lambda X) = \lambda \rho_t(X)$

== Acceptance set ==
The acceptance set at time $t$ associated with a conditional risk measure is

$$A_t = \{X \in L^{\infty}_T: \rho_t(X) \leq 0 \text{ a.s.}\}$$.

If you are given an acceptance set at time $t$ then the corresponding conditional risk measure is

$$\rho_t = \text{ess}\inf\{Y \in L^{\infty}_t: X + Y \in A_t\}$$

where $\text{ess}\inf$ is the essential infimum.

== Regular property ==
A conditional risk measure $\rho_t$ is said to be regular if for any $X \in L^{\infty}_T$ and $A \in \mathcal{F}_t$ then $\rho_t(1_A X) = 1_A \rho_t(X)$ where $1_A$ is the indicator function on $A$. Any normalized conditional convex risk measure is regular.

The financial interpretation of this states that the conditional risk at some future node (i.e. $\rho_t(X)[\omega]$) only depends on the possible states from that node. In a binomial model this would be akin to calculating the risk on the subtree branching off from the point in question.

== Time consistent property ==
A dynamic risk measure is time consistent if and only if $\rho_{t+1}(X) \leq \rho_{t+1}(Y) \Rightarrow \rho_t(X) \leq \rho_t(Y) \; \forall X,Y \in L^{0}(\mathcal{F}_T)$.

== Example: dynamic superhedging price ==
The dynamic superhedging price involves conditional risk measures of the form $\rho_t(-X) = \operatorname*{ess\sup}_{Q \in EMM} \mathbb{E}^Q[X | \mathcal{F}_t]$. It is shown that this is a time consistent risk measure.
