= Risk measure =

Concept in financial mathematics

In financial mathematics, a risk measure assigns a numerical value to the risk associated with a financial position or portfolio. In financial management and insurance, risk measures are often used to determine capital reserve requirements to mitigate downside risk to make it acceptable to regulators. In recent years attention has turned to convex and coherent risk measurement.

== Mathematical Description ==
A risk measure is defined as a mapping from a set of random variables to the real numbers. Depending on context, the random variables may represent portfolio returns or insurance losses. In the former case, risk is associated with the left tail of the distribution, while in the latter it is associated with the right tail.

The common notation for a risk measure associated with a random variable $X$ is $\rho(X)$. A risk measure $\rho: \mathcal{L} \to \mathbb{R} \cup \{+\infty\}$ should have certain properties:

Normalized
$$\rho(0) = 0$$

Translative
$$\mathrm{If}\; a \in \mathbb{R} \; \mathrm{and} \; Z \in \mathcal{L} ,\;\mathrm{then}\; \rho(Z + a) = \rho(Z) - a$$

Monotone
$$\mathrm{If}\; Z_1,Z_2 \in \mathcal{L} \;\mathrm{and}\; Z_1 \leq Z_2 ,\; \mathrm{then} \; \rho(Z_2) \leq \rho(Z_1)$$

== Set-valued ==
In a situation with $\mathbb{R}^d$-valued portfolios such that risk can be measured in $m \leq d$ of the assets, then a set of portfolios is the proper way to depict risk. Set-valued risk measures are useful for markets with transaction costs.

=== Mathematically ===
A set-valued risk measure is a function $R: L_d^p \rightarrow \mathbb{F}_M$, where $L_d^p$ is a $d$-dimensional Lp space, $\mathbb{F}_M = \{D \subseteq M: D = cl (D + K_M)\}$, and $K_M = K \cap M$ where $K$ is a constant solvency cone and $M$ is the set of portfolios of the $m$ reference assets. $R$ must have the following properties:

Normalized
$$K_M \subseteq R(0) \text{ and } R(0) \cap -\operatorname{int}K_M = \emptyset$$

Translative in M
$$\forall X \in L_d^p, \forall u \in M: R(X + u1) = R(X) - u$$

Monotone
$$\forall X_2 - X_1 \in L_d^p(K) \Rightarrow R(X_2) \supseteq R(X_1)$$

== Examples ==
- Value at risk
- Expected shortfall
- Superposed risk measures
- Entropic value at risk
- Drawdown
- Tail conditional expectation
- Entropic risk measure
- Superhedging price
- Expectile

=== Variance ===
Variance (or standard deviation) is not a risk measure in the above sense. This can be seen since it has neither the translation property nor monotonicity. That is, $Var(X + a) = Var(X) \neq Var(X) - a$ for all $a \in \mathbb{R}$, and a simple counterexample for monotonicity can be found. The standard deviation is a deviation risk measure. To avoid any confusion, note that deviation risk measures, such as variance and standard deviation are sometimes called risk measures in different fields.

== Relation to acceptance set ==
There is a one-to-one correspondence between an acceptance set and a corresponding risk measure. As defined below it can be shown that $R_{A_R}(X) = R(X)$ and $A_{R_A} = A$.

=== Risk measure to acceptance set ===
- If $\rho$ is a (scalar) risk measure then $A_{\rho} = \{X \in L^p: \rho(X) \leq 0\}$ is an acceptance set.
- If $R$ is a set-valued risk measure then $A_R = \{X \in L^p_d: 0 \in R(X)\}$ is an acceptance set.

=== Acceptance set to risk measure ===
- If $A$ is an acceptance set (in 1-d) then $\rho_A(X) = \inf\{u \in \mathbb{R}: X + u1 \in A\}$ defines a (scalar) risk measure.
- If $A$ is an acceptance set then $R_A(X) = \{u \in M: X + u1 \in A\}$ is a set-valued risk measure.

== Relation with deviation risk measure ==
There is a one-to-one relationship between a deviation risk measure D and an expectation-bounded risk measure $\rho$ where for any $X \in \mathcal{L}^2$

- $D(X) = \rho(X - \mathbb{E}[X])$
- $\rho(X) = D(X) - \mathbb{E}[X]$.

$\rho$ is called expectation bounded if it satisfies $\rho(X) > \mathbb{E}[-X]$ for any nonconstant X and $\rho(X) = \mathbb{E}[-X]$ for any constant X.

== See also ==
- Coherent risk measure
- Conditional value-at-risk
- Distortion risk measure
- Dynamic risk measure
- Entropic value at risk
- Expected shortfall
- Managerial risk accounting
- Risk management
- Risk metric - the abstract concept that a risk measure quantifies
- Risk return ratio
- RiskMetrics - a model for risk management
- Spectral risk measure
- Value at risk
- Worst-case risk measure
- Empirical risk minimization
