= Minimal-entropy martingale measure =

Method used to minimise uncertainty between probabilities

In probability theory, the minimal-entropy martingale measure (MEMM) is the risk-neutral probability measure that minimises the entropy difference between the objective probability measure, $P$, and the risk-neutral measure, $Q$. In incomplete markets, this is one way of choosing a risk-neutral measure (from the infinite number available) so as to still maintain the no-arbitrage conditions.

The MEMM has the advantage that the measure $Q$ will always be equivalent to the measure $P$ by construction. Another common choice of equivalent martingale measure is the minimal martingale measure, which minimises the variance of the equivalent martingale. For certain situations, the resultant measure $Q$ will not be equivalent to $P$.

In a finite probability model, for objective probabilities $p_i$ and risk-neutral probabilities $q_i$ then one must minimise the Kullback–Leibler divergence $D_{KL}(Q\|P) = \sum_{i=1}^N q_i \ln\left(\frac{q_i}{p_i}\right)$ subject to the requirement that the expected return is $r$, where $r$ is the risk-free rate.

== See also ==
- Entropic risk measure
