= Double digital option =

A double digital option is a particular variety of option (a financial derivative). At maturity, the payoff is 1 if the spot price of the underlying asset is between two numbers, the lower and upper strikes of the option; otherwise, it is 0.

A double digital option is similar to the exotic option with a few exceptions. for instance a double digital option has two strike prices that is the expected price during the trade season. The option has two types of strikes namely the lower and the upper strikes.

A double digital with lower strike K_{1} and upper strike K_{2} can be replicated by going long a digital option with strike K_{1} and short another digital option with strike K_{2}.

== Market terminology ==
In market documentation, a double digital option may also be referred to as a range binary option. FpML examples describe a “European range binary option” as a contract in which the payoff at expiry depends on the underlying remaining below an upper trigger rate and above a lower trigger rate.

This terminology reflects the payoff structure of a double digital option, which provides a fixed payoff only when the underlying finishes within a specified range at maturity.
