= Acceptance set =

In financial mathematics, acceptance set is a set of acceptable future net worth which is acceptable to the regulator. It is related to risk measures.

== Mathematical Definition ==
Given a probability space $(\Omega,\mathcal{F},\mathbb{P})$, and letting $L^p = L^p(\Omega,\mathcal{F},\mathbb{P})$ be the Lp space in the scalar case and $L_d^p = L_d^p(\Omega,\mathcal{F},\mathbb{P})$ in d-dimensions, then we can define acceptance sets as below.

=== Scalar Case ===
An acceptance set is a set $A$ satisfying:

1. $A \supseteq L^p_+$
2. $A \cap L^p_{--} = \emptyset$ such that $L^p_{--} = \{X \in L^p: \forall \omega \in \Omega, X(\omega) < 0\}$
3. $A \cap L^p_- = \{0\}$
4. Additionally if $A$ is convex then it is a convex acceptance set
  1. And if $A$ is a positively homogeneous cone then it is a coherent acceptance set

=== Set-valued Case ===
An acceptance set (in a space with $d$ assets) is a set $A \subseteq L^p_d$ satisfying:

1. $u \in K_M \Rightarrow u1 \in A$ with $1$ denoting the random variable that is constantly 1 $\mathbb{P}$-a.s.
2. $u \in -\mathrm{int}K_M \Rightarrow u1 \not\in A$
3. $A$ is directionally closed in $M$ with $A + u1 \subseteq A \; \forall u \in K_M$
4. $A + L^p_d(K) \subseteq A$

Additionally, if $A$ is convex (a convex cone) then it is called a convex (coherent) acceptance set.

Note that $K_M = K \cap M$ where $K$ is a constant solvency cone and $M$ is the set of portfolios of the $m$ reference assets.

== Relation to Risk Measures ==
An acceptance set is convex (coherent) if and only if the corresponding risk measure is convex (coherent). As defined below it can be shown that $R_{A_R}(X) = R(X)$ and $A_{R_A} = A$.

=== Risk Measure to Acceptance Set ===
- If $\rho$ is a (scalar) risk measure then $A_{\rho} = \{X \in L^p: \rho(X) \leq 0\}$ is an acceptance set.
- If $R$ is a set-valued risk measure then $A_R = \{X \in L^p_d: 0 \in R(X)\}$ is an acceptance set.

=== Acceptance Set to Risk Measure ===
- If $A$ is an acceptance set (in 1-d) then $\rho_A(X) = \inf\{u \in \mathbb{R}: X + u1 \in A\}$ defines a (scalar) risk measure.
- If $A$ is an acceptance set then $R_A(X) = \{u \in M: X + u1 \in A\}$ is a set-valued risk measure.

== Examples ==
=== Superhedging price ===
The acceptance set associated with the superhedging price is the negative of the set of values of a self-financing portfolio at the terminal time. That is

$$A = \{-V_T: (V_t)_{t=0}^T \text{ is the price of a self-financing portfolio at each time}\}$$.

=== Entropic risk measure ===
The acceptance set associated with the entropic risk measure is the set of payoffs with positive expected utility. That is

$$A = \{X \in L^p(\mathcal{F}): E[u(X)] \geq 0\} = \{X \in L^p(\mathcal{F}): E\left[e^{-\theta X}\right] \leq 1\}$$

where $u(X)$ is the exponential utility function.
