= Spectral risk measure =

Coherent risk measure using weighted outcomes based on risk aversion

A Spectral risk measure is a risk measure given as a weighted average of outcomes where bad outcomes are, typically, included with larger weights. A spectral risk measure is a function of portfolio returns and outputs the amount of the numeraire (typically a currency) to be kept in reserve. A spectral risk measure is always a coherent risk measure, but the converse does not always hold. An advantage of spectral measures is the way in which they can be related to risk aversion, and particularly to a utility function, through the weights given to the possible portfolio returns.

== Definition ==
Consider a portfolio $X$ (denoting the portfolio payoff). Then a spectral risk measure $M_{\phi}: \mathcal{L} \to \mathbb{R}$ where $\phi$ is non-negative, non-increasing, right-continuous, integrable function defined on $[0,1]$ such that $\int_0^1 \phi(p)dp = 1$ is defined by

$$M_{\phi}(X) = -\int_0^1 \phi(p) F_X^{-1}(p) dp$$

where $F_X$ is the cumulative distribution function for X.

If there are $S$ equiprobable outcomes with the corresponding payoffs given by the order statistics $X_{1:S}, ... X_{S:S}$. Let $\phi\in\mathbb{R}^S$. The measure $M_{\phi}:\mathbb{R}^S\rightarrow \mathbb{R}$ defined by $M_{\phi}(X)=-\delta\sum_{s=1}^S\phi_sX_{s:S}$ is a spectral measure of risk if $\phi\in\mathbb{R}^S$ satisfies the conditions

1. Nonnegativity: $\phi_s\geq0$ for all $s=1, \dots, S$,
2. Normalization: $\sum_{s=1}^S\phi_s=1$,
3. Monotonicity : $\phi_s$ is non-increasing, that is $\phi_{s_1}\geq\phi_{s_2}$ if ${s_1}<{s_2}$ and ${s_1}, {s_2}\in\{1,\dots,S\}$.

== Properties ==
Spectral risk measures are also coherent. Every spectral risk measure $\rho: \mathcal{L} \to \mathbb{R}$ satisfies:

1. Positive Homogeneity: for every portfolio X and positive value $\lambda > 0$, $\rho(\lambda X) = \lambda \rho(X)$;
2. Translation-Invariance: for every portfolio X and $\alpha \in \mathbb{R}$, $\rho(X + a) = \rho(X) - a$;
3. Monotonicity: for all portfolios X and Y such that $X \geq Y$, $\rho(X) \leq \rho(Y)$;
4. Sub-additivity: for all portfolios X and Y, $\rho(X+Y) \leq \rho(X) + \rho(Y)$;
5. Law-Invariance: for all portfolios X and Y with cumulative distribution functions $F_X$ and $F_Y$ respectively, if $F_X = F_Y$ then $\rho(X) = \rho(Y)$;
6. Comonotonic Additivity: for every comonotonic random variables X and Y, $\rho(X+Y) = \rho(X) + \rho(Y)$. Note that X and Y are comonotonic if for every $\omega_1,\omega_2 \in \Omega: \; (X(\omega_2) - X(\omega_1))(Y(\omega_2) - Y(\omega_1)) \geq 0$.

In some texts the input X is interpreted as losses rather than payoff of a portfolio. In this case, the translation-invariance property would be given by $\rho(X+a) = \rho(X) + a$, and the monotonicity property by $X \geq Y \implies \rho(X) \geq \rho(Y)$ instead of the above.

== Examples ==
- The expected shortfall is a spectral measure of risk.
- The expected value is trivially a spectral measure of risk.

== See also ==
- Distortion risk measure – Risk measure derived by applying a distortion function to a loss distribution
