= Distortion function =

A distortion function in mathematics and statistics, for example, $g: [0,1] \to [0,1]$, is a non-decreasing function such that $g(0) = 0$ and $g(1) = 1$. The dual distortion function is $\tilde{g}(x) = 1 - g(1-x)$. Distortion functions are used to define distortion risk measures.
