= Complete market =

Concept in economics

In economics, a complete market (a.k.a. Arrow-Debreu market or complete system of markets) is a market with two conditions:

1. Negligible transaction costs and therefore also perfect information,
2. Every asset in every possible state of the world has a price.

In such a market, the complete set of possible bets on future states of the world can be constructed with existing assets without friction. Here, goods are state-contingent; that is, a good includes the time and state of the world in which it is consumed. For instance, an umbrella tomorrow if it rains is a distinct good from an umbrella tomorrow if it is clear. The study of complete markets is central to state-preference theory. The theory can be traced to the work of Kenneth Arrow (1964), Gérard Debreu (1959), Arrow & Debreu (1954) and Lionel McKenzie (1954). Arrow and Debreu were awarded the Nobel Memorial Prize in Economics (Arrow in 1972, Debreu in 1983), largely for their work in developing the theory of complete markets and applying it to the problem of general equilibrium.

== States of the world ==
A state of the world is a complete specification of the values of all relevant variables over the relevant time horizon. A state-contingent claim, or state claim, is a contract whose future payoffs depend on future states of the world. For example, suppose you can bet on the outcome of a coin toss. If you guess the outcome correctly, you will win one dollar, and otherwise you will lose one dollar. A bet on heads is a state claim, with payoff of one dollar if heads is the outcome, and payoff of negative one dollar if tails is the outcome. "Heads" and "tails" are the states of the world in this example. A state-contingent claim can be represented as a payoff vector with one element for each state of the world, e.g. (payoff if heads, payoff if tails). So a bet on heads can be represented as ($1, −$1) and a bet on tails can be represented as (−$1, $1). Notice that by placing one bet on heads and one bet on tails, you have a state-contingent claim of ($0, $0); that is, the payoff is the same regardless of which state of the world occurs.

== Dynamically-complete market ==
In order for a market to be complete, it must be possible to instantaneously enter into any position regarding any future state of the market.

== See also ==
- Incomplete markets
