= Essential infimum and essential supremum =

Infimum and supremum almost everywhere

In mathematics, the concepts of essential infimum and essential supremum are related to the notions of infimum and supremum, but adapted to measure theory and functional analysis, where one often deals with statements that are not valid for all elements in a set, but rather almost everywhere, that is, except on a set of measure zero.

While the exact definition is not immediately straightforward, intuitively the essential supremum of a function is the smallest value that is greater than or equal to the function values everywhere while ignoring what the function does at a set of points of measure zero. For example, if one takes the function $f(x)$ that is equal to zero everywhere except at $x = 0$ where $f(0) = 1,$ then the supremum of the function equals one. However, its essential supremum is zero since (under the Lebesgue measure) one can ignore what the function does at the single point where $f$ is peculiar. The essential infimum is defined in a similar way.

== Definition ==
As is often the case in measure-theoretic questions, the definition of essential supremum and infimum does not start by asking what a function $f$ does at points $x$ (that is, the image of $f$), but rather by asking for the set of points $x$ where $f$ equals a specific value $y$ (that is, the preimage of $y$ under $f$).

Let $f : X \to \Reals$ be a real valued function defined on a set $X.$ The supremum of a function $f$ is characterized by the following property: $f(x) \leq \sup f \leq \infty$ for all $x \in X$ and if for some $a \in \Reals \cup \{+\infty\}$ we have $f(x) \leq a$ for all $x \in X$ then $\sup f \leq a.$ More concretely, a real number $a$ is called an upper bound for $f$ if $f(x) \leq a$ for all $x \in X;$ that is, if the set
$$f^{-1}(a, \infty) = \{x \in X : f(x) > a\}$$
is empty. Let
$$U_f = \{a \in \Reals : f^{-1}(a, \infty) = \varnothing\}\,$$
be the set of upper bounds of $f$ and define the infimum of the empty set by $\inf \varnothing = +\infty.$ Then the supremum of $f$ is
$$\sup f = \inf U_f.$$
By definition, if the set of upper bounds $U_f$ is empty, we have $\sup f = + \infty$.

Now assume in addition that $(X, \Sigma, \mu)$ is a measure space and, for simplicity, assume that the function $f$ is measurable. Similar to the supremum, the essential supremum of a function is characterised by the following property: $f(x) \leq \operatorname{ess} \sup f \leq \infty$ for $\mu$-almost all $x \in X$ and if for some $a \in \Reals \cup \{+\infty\}$ we have $f(x) \leq a$ for $\mu$-almost all $x \in X$ then $\operatorname{ess} \sup f \leq a.$ More concretely, a number $a$ is called an essential upper bound of $f$ if the measurable set $f^{-1}(a, \infty)$ is a set of $\mu$-measure zero, (Note: For nonmeasurable functions the definition has to be modified by assuming that $f^{-1}(a, \infty)$ is contained in a set of measure zero. Alternatively, one can assume that the measure is complete.) That is, if $f(x) \leq a$ for $\mu$-almost all $x$ in $X.$ Let
$$U^{\operatorname{ess}}_f = \{a \in \Reals : \mu(f^{-1}(a, \infty)) = 0\}$$
be the set of essential upper bounds. Then the essential supremum is defined similarly as
$$\operatorname{ess} \sup f = \inf U^{\mathrm{ess}}_f$$
if $U^{\operatorname{ess}}_f \neq \varnothing,$ and $\operatorname{ess}\sup f = +\infty$ otherwise.

Exactly in the same way one defines the essential infimum as the supremum of the essential lower bounds, that is,
$$\operatorname{ess} \inf f = \sup \{b \in \Reals : \mu(\{x: f(x) < b\}) = 0\}$$
if the set of essential lower bounds is nonempty, and as $-\infty$ otherwise; again there is an alternative expression as $\operatorname{ess} \inf f = \sup\{a \in \Reals : f(x) \geq a \text{ for almost all } x \in X\}$ (with this being $-\infty$ if the set is empty).

== Examples ==
On the real line consider the Lebesgue measure and its corresponding 𝜎-algebra $\Sigma.$ Define a function $f$ by the formula
$$f(x) = \begin{cases}
5, & \text{if } x=1 \\
-4, & \text{if } x = -1 \\
2, & \text{otherwise.}
\end{cases}$$

The supremum of this function (largest value) is 5, and the infimum (smallest value) is −4. However, the function takes these values only on the sets $\{1\}$ and $\{-1\},$ respectively, which are of measure zero. Everywhere else, the function takes the value 2. Thus, the essential supremum and the essential infimum of this function are both 2.

As another example, consider the function
$$f(x) = \begin{cases}
x^3, & \text{if } x \in \Q \\
\arctan x, & \text{if } x \in \Reals \smallsetminus \Q \\
\end{cases}$$
where $\Q$ denotes the rational numbers. This function is unbounded both from above and from below, so its supremum and infimum are $\infty$ and $-\infty,$ respectively. However, from the point of view of the Lebesgue measure, the set of rational numbers is of measure zero; thus, what really matters is what happens in the complement of this set, where the function is given as $\arctan x.$ It follows that the essential supremum is $\pi / 2$ while the essential infimum is $-\pi / 2.$

On the other hand, consider the function $f(x) = x^3$ defined for all real $x.$ Its essential supremum is $+\infty,$ and its essential infimum is $-\infty.$

Lastly, consider the function
$$f(x) = \begin{cases}
1/x, & \text{if } x \neq 0 \\
0,   & \text{if } x = 0. \\
\end{cases}$$
Then for any $a \in \Reals,$ $\mu(\{x \in \Reals : 1/x > a\}) \geq \tfrac{1}{|a|}$ and so $U_f^{\operatorname{ess}} = \varnothing$ and $\operatorname{ess} \sup f = +\infty.$

== Properties ==
If $\mu(X) > 0$ then
$$\inf f ~\leq~ \operatorname{ess} \inf f ~\leq~ \operatorname{ess}\sup f ~\leq~ \sup f.$$
and otherwise, if $X$ has measure zero then
$$+\infty ~=~ \operatorname{ess}\inf f ~\geq~ \operatorname{ess}\sup f ~=~ -\infty.$$

If $f$ and $g$ are measurable, then

$$\operatorname{ess\,sup} (f + g)
\le  \operatorname{ess\,sup} f + \operatorname{ess\,sup} g$$

and

$$\operatorname{ess\,inf} (f + g)
\ge  \operatorname{ess\,inf} f + \operatorname{ess\,inf} g.$$

If $f$ and $g$ are measurable and if $f \le g$ almost everywhere, then

$$\operatorname{ess\,sup} f
\le  \operatorname{ess\,sup} g$$

and

$$\operatorname{ess\,inf} f
\le  \operatorname{ess\,inf} g.$$

If the essential supremums of two functions $f$ and $g$ are both nonnegative, then $\operatorname{ess}\sup (f g) ~\leq~ (\operatorname{ess}\sup f) \, (\operatorname{ess}\sup g).$

The essential supremum of a function is not just the infimum of the essential upper bounds, but also their minimum. A similar result holds for the essential infimum.

Given a measure space $(S, \Sigma, \mu),$ the space $\mathcal{L}^\infty(S, \mu)$ consisting of all of measurable functions that are bounded almost everywhere is a seminormed space whose seminorm
$$\|f\|_\infty = \inf \{C \in \Reals_{\geq 0} : |f(x)| \leq C \text{ for almost every } x\}
= \begin{cases}
\operatorname{ess}\sup |f| & \text{ if } 0 < \mu(S),\\
0 & \text{ if } 0 = \mu(S),
\end{cases}$$
is the essential supremum of a function's absolute value when $\mu(S) \neq 0.$ (Note: If $\mu(S) = 0$ then $\operatorname{ess}\sup|f| = -\infty.$)

== See also ==
- Essential range
- $L^p$ space – Function spaces generalizing finite-dimensional p norm spaces
