= Coherent risk measure =

Concept in financial economics

In the fields of actuarial science and financial economics there are a number of ways that risk can be defined; to clarify the concept theoreticians have described a number of properties that a risk measure might or might not have. A coherent risk measure is a function that satisfies properties of monotonicity, sub-additivity, homogeneity, and translational invariance.

== Properties ==
Consider a random outcome $X$ viewed as an element of a linear space $\mathcal{L}$ of measurable functions, defined on an appropriate probability space. A functional $\varrho : \mathcal{L}$ → $\R \cup \{+\infty\}$ is said to be coherent risk measure for $\mathcal{L}$ if it satisfies the following properties:

=== Normalized ===
$$\varrho(0) = 0$$

That is, the risk when holding no assets is zero.

=== Monotonicity ===
$$\mathrm{If}\; Z_1,Z_2 \in \mathcal{L} \;\mathrm{and}\; Z_1 \leq Z_2 \; \mathrm{a.s.} ,\; \mathrm{then} \; \varrho(Z_1) \geq \varrho(Z_2)$$

That is, if portfolio $Z_2$ always has better values than portfolio $Z_1$ under almost all scenarios then the risk of $Z_2$ should be less than the risk of $Z_1$. E.g. If $Z_1$ is an in the money call option (or otherwise) on a stock, and $Z_2$ is also an in the money call option with a lower strike price. In financial risk management, monotonicity implies a portfolio with greater future returns has less risk.

=== Sub-additivity ===
$$\mathrm{If}\; Z_1,Z_2 \in \mathcal{L} ,\; \mathrm{then}\; \varrho(Z_1 + Z_2) \leq \varrho(Z_1) + \varrho(Z_2)$$

Indeed, the risk of two portfolios together cannot get any worse than adding the two risks separately: this is the diversification principle. In financial risk management, sub-additivity implies diversification is beneficial. The sub-additivity principle is sometimes also seen as problematic.

=== Positive homogeneity ===
$$\mathrm{If}\; \alpha \ge 0 \; \mathrm{and} \; Z \in \mathcal{L} ,\; \mathrm{then} \; \varrho(\alpha Z) = \alpha \varrho(Z)$$

Loosely speaking, if you double your portfolio then you double your risk. In financial risk management, positive homogeneity implies the risk of a position is proportional to its size.

=== Translation invariance ===
If $A$ is a deterministic portfolio with guaranteed return $a$ and $Z \in \mathcal{L}$ then

$$\varrho(Z + A) = \varrho(Z) - a$$

The portfolio $A$ is just adding cash $a$ to your portfolio $Z$. In particular, if $a=\varrho(Z)$ then $\varrho(Z+A)=0$. In financial risk management, translation invariance implies that the addition of a sure amount of capital reduces the risk by the same amount.

=== Convex risk measures ===
The notion of coherence has been subsequently relaxed. Indeed, the notions of Sub-additivity and Positive Homogeneity can be replaced by the notion of convexity:

Convexity
$$\text{If }Z_1,Z_2 \in \mathcal{L}\text{ and }\lambda \in [0,1] \text{ then }\varrho(\lambda Z_1 + (1-\lambda) Z_2) \leq \lambda \varrho(Z_1) + (1-\lambda) \varrho(Z_2)$$

== Examples of risk measure ==
=== Value at risk ===
It is well known that value at risk is not a coherent risk measure as it does not respect the sub-additivity property. An immediate consequence is that value at risk might discourage diversification. Value at risk is, however, coherent, under the assumption of elliptically distributed losses (e.g. normally distributed) when the portfolio value is a linear function of the asset prices. However, in this case the value at risk becomes equivalent to a mean-variance approach where the risk of a portfolio is measured by the variance of the portfolio's return.

The Wang transform function (distortion function) for the Value at Risk is $g(x)=\mathbf{1}_{x\geq 1-\alpha}$. The non-concavity of $g$ proves the non coherence of this risk measure.

Illustration

As a simple example to demonstrate the non-coherence of value-at-risk consider looking at the VaR of a portfolio at 95% confidence over the next year of two default-able zero coupon bonds that mature in 1 years time denominated in our numeraire currency.

Assume the following:

- The current yield on the two bonds is 0%
- The two bonds are from different issuers
- Each bond has a 4% probability of defaulting over the next year
- The event of default in either bond is independent of the other
- Upon default the bonds have a recovery rate of 30%

Under these conditions the 95% VaR for holding either of the bonds is 0 since the probability of default is less than 5%. However if we held a portfolio that consisted of 50% of each bond by value then the 95% VaR is 35% (= 0.5*0.7 + 0.5*0) since the probability of at least one of the bonds defaulting is 7.84% (= 1 - 0.96*0.96) which exceeds 5%. This violates the sub-additivity property showing that VaR is not a coherent risk measure.

=== Average value at risk ===
The average value at risk (sometimes called expected shortfall or conditional value-at-risk or $AVaR$) is a coherent risk measure, even though it is derived from Value at Risk which is not. The domain can be extended for more general Orlitz Hearts from the more typical Lp spaces.

=== Entropic value at risk ===
The entropic value at risk is a coherent risk measure.

=== Tail value at risk ===
The tail value at risk (or tail conditional expectation) is a coherent risk measure only when the underlying distribution is continuous.

The Wang transform function (distortion function) for the tail value at risk is $g(x)=\min(\frac{x}{\alpha},1)$. The concavity of $g$ proves the coherence of this risk measure in the case of continuous distribution.

=== Proportional Hazard (PH) risk measure ===
The PH risk measure (or Proportional Hazard Risk measure) transforms the hazard rates $\scriptstyle \left( \lambda(t) = \frac{f(t)}{\bar{F}(t)}\right)$ using a coefficient $\xi$.

The Wang transform function (distortion function) for the PH risk measure is $g_{\alpha}(x) = x^{\xi}$. The concavity of $g$ if $\scriptstyle \xi<\frac{1}{2}$ proves the coherence of this risk measure.

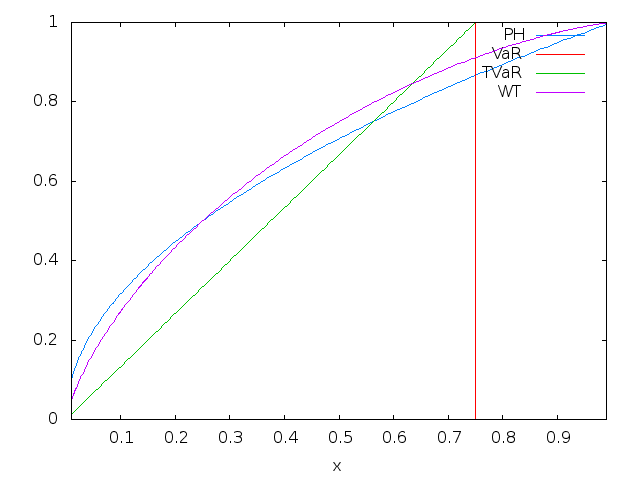
Sample of Wang transform function or distortion function

=== g-Entropic risk measures ===
g-entropic risk measures are a class of information-theoretic coherent risk measures that involve some important cases such as CVaR and EVaR.

=== The Wang risk measure ===
The Wang risk measure is defined by the following Wang transform function (distortion function) $g_{\alpha}(x)=\Phi\left[ \Phi^{-1}(x)-\Phi^{-1}(\alpha)\right]$. The coherence of this risk measure is a consequence of the concavity of $g$.

=== Entropic risk measure ===
The entropic risk measure is a convex risk measure which is not coherent. It is related to the exponential utility.

=== Superhedging price ===
The superhedging price is a coherent risk measure.

== Set-valued ==
In a situation with $\mathbb{R}^d$-valued portfolios such that risk can be measured in $n \leq d$ of the assets, then a set of portfolios is the proper way to depict risk. Set-valued risk measures are useful for markets with transaction costs.

=== Properties ===
A set-valued coherent risk measure is a function $R: L_d^p \rightarrow \mathbb{F}_M$, where $\mathbb{F}_M = \{D \subseteq M: D = cl (D + K_M)\}$ and $K_M = K \cap M$ where $K$ is a constant solvency cone and $M$ is the set of portfolios of the $m$ reference assets. $R$ must have the following properties:

Normalized
$$K_M \subseteq R(0) \; \mathrm{and} \; R(0) \cap -\mathrm{int}K_M = \emptyset$$

Translative in M
$$\forall X \in L_d^p, \forall u \in M: R(X + u1) = R(X) - u$$

Monotone
$$\forall X_2 - X_1 \in L_d^p(K) \Rightarrow R(X_2) \supseteq R(X_1)$$

Sublinear

== General framework of Wang transform ==
Wang transform of the cumulative distribution function

A Wang transform of the cumulative distribution function is an increasing function $g \colon [0,1] \rightarrow [0,1]$ where $g(0)=0$ and $g(1)=1$. This function is called distortion function or Wang transform function.

The dual distortion function is $\tilde{g}(x) = 1 - g(1-x)$. Given a probability space $(\Omega,\mathcal{F},\mathbb{P})$, then for any random variable $X$ and any distortion function $g$ we can define a new probability measure $\mathbb{Q}$ such that for any $A \in \mathcal{F}$ it follows that $\mathbb{Q}(A) = g(\mathbb{P}(X \in A)).$

Actuarial premium principle

For any increasing concave Wang transform function, we could define a corresponding premium principle : $\varrho(X)=\int_0^{+\infty}g\left(\bar{F}_X(x)\right) dx$

Coherent risk measure

A coherent risk measure could be defined by a Wang transform of the cumulative distribution function $g$ if and only if $g$ is concave.

=== Set-valued convex risk measure ===
If instead of the sublinear property,R is convex, then R is a set-valued convex risk measure.

== Dual representation ==
A lower semi-continuous convex risk measure $\varrho$ can be represented as

$$\varrho(X) = \sup_{Q \in \mathcal{M}(P)} \{E^Q[-X] - \alpha(Q)\}$$

such that $\alpha$ is a penalty function and $\mathcal{M}(P)$ is the set of probability measures absolutely continuous with respect to P (the "real world" probability measure), i.e. $\mathcal{M}(P) = \{Q \ll P\}$. The dual characterization is tied to $L^p$ spaces, Orlitz hearts, and their dual spaces.

A lower semi-continuous risk measure is coherent if and only if it can be represented as

$$\varrho(X) = \sup_{Q \in \mathcal{Q}} E^Q[-X]$$

such that $\mathcal{Q} \subseteq \mathcal{M}(P)$.

== See also ==
- Risk metric - the abstract concept that a risk measure quantifies
- RiskMetrics - a model for risk management
- Spectral risk measure - a subset of coherent risk measures
- Distortion risk measure
- Conditional value-at-risk
- Entropic value at risk
- Financial risk
