= HRP =

HRP may refer to:

== Political parties ==
- Happiness Realization Party, a Japanese political party
- Haryana Republican Party, a political party in Haryana, India
- Hawaii Republican Party, an American political party
- Human Rights Party (disambiguation)

== Science, technology, and medicine ==
- Haptoglobin-related protein, a serum protein involved in immunity to parasites
- Hierarchical Risk Parity, an advanced investment portfolio optimization framework
- Horseradish peroxidase, an enzyme used as a marker
- IEEE 802.15.4 HRP (High-Rate Pulse) Ultra-Wideband (UWB) Radio Standard
- HRP, a Rockwell scale of materials' hardness
- HRP Rescuer, an American helicopter
- Human Research Program, a NASA program
- Humanoid Robotics Project
- Special Programme on Human Reproduction (HRP), a World Health Organization endeavor

== Other uses ==
- Halifax Regional Police, in Halifax, Nova Scotia, Canada
- Hard Rock Park, now the Freestyle Music Park in Myrtle Beach, South Carolina, United States
- The Harvard Review of Philosophy
- Haute Randonnée Pyrénéenne, a hiking trail in France
- Historic Royal Palaces
- Human remains pouch, or body bag
- Human resource planning
- Hutchinson River Parkway and Expressway in New York City.
- Yandruwandha language, an Australian Aboriginal language
