= Separation property (finance) =

A separation property is a crucial element of modern portfolio theory that gives a portfolio manager the ability to separate the process of satisfying investing clients' assets into two separate parts.

The first part is the determination of the "optimum risky portfolio". This portfolio is the same for all clients. In one version, it has the highest Sharpe ratio. See mutual fund separation theorem for a discussion of other possibilities. It is the construction of a universal portfolio that is kept separate from the individual needs of each client.

The second part is tailoring the use of that portfolio to the risk-aversive needs of each individual client. This is achieved through simulation of a given risk-return range by allocating the client's total investments partly to that universal portfolio and partly to the risk-free asset.

== See also ==
- Markowitz model #Choosing the best portfolio - an expansion of the above
- Mutual fund separation theorem - relating to the construction of optimal portfolios
- Fisher separation theorem - discussing an analogous result in corporate finance
