= Single-index model =

Economic model

The single-index model (SIM) is a simple asset pricing model to measure both the risk and the return of a stock. The model was developed by William Sharpe in 1963 and is commonly used in the finance industry, including portfolio optimization.

== Formulation ==
Mathematically the SIM is expressed as:

$$r_{it} - r_f = \alpha_i + \beta_i(r_{mt} - r_f) + \epsilon_{it} \,$$
$$\epsilon_{it} \sim N(0,\sigma_i^2) \,$$

where:

r_{it} is return to stock i in period t
r_{f} is the risk free rate (i.e. the interest rate on treasury bills)
r_{mt} is the return to the market portfolio in period t
$\alpha_i$ is the stock's alpha, or abnormal return
$\beta_i$ is the stock's beta, or responsiveness to the market return
Note that $r_{it} - r_f$ is called the excess return on the stock, $r_{mt} - r_f$ the excess return on the market
$\epsilon_{it}$ are the residual (random) returns, which are assumed independent normally distributed with mean zero and standard deviation $\sigma_i$

These equations show that the stock return is influenced by the market (beta), has a firm specific expected value (alpha) and firm-specific unexpected component (residual). Each stock's performance is in relation to the performance of a market index (such as the All Ordinaries). Security analysts often use the SIM for such functions as computing stock betas, evaluating stock selection skills, and conducting event studies.

== Assumptions ==
To simplify analysis, the single-index model assumes that there is only 1 macroeconomic factor that causes the systematic risk affecting all stock returns and this factor can be represented by the rate of return on a market index, such as the S&P 500.

According to this model, the return of any stock can be decomposed into the expected excess return of the individual stock due to firm-specific factors, commonly denoted by its alpha coefficient (α), the return due to macroeconomic events that affect the market, and the unexpected microeconomic events that affect only the firm.

The term $\beta_i(r_m-r_f)$ represents the movement of the market modified by the stock's beta, while $\epsilon_{i}$ represents the unsystematic risk of the security due to firm-specific factors. Macroeconomic events, such as changes in interest rates or the cost of labor, causes the systematic risk that affects the returns of all stocks, and the firm-specific events are the unexpected microeconomic events that affect the returns of specific firms, such as the death of key people or the lowering of the firm's credit rating, that would affect the firm, but would have a negligible effect on the economy. In a portfolio, the unsystematic risk due to firm-specific factors can be reduced to zero by diversification.

The index model is thus based on the following:

- Most stocks have a positive covariance because they all respond similarly to macroeconomic factors.
- However, some firms are more sensitive to these factors than others, and this firm-specific variance is typically denoted by its beta (β), which measures its variance compared to the market for one or more economic factors.
- Covariance among securities result from differing responses to macroeconomic factors. Hence, the covariance of each stock can be found by multiplying their betas and the market variance:

The single-index model assumes that once the market return is subtracted out the remaining returns are uncorrelated:

$$E((R_{i,t} - \beta_i m_t) (R_{k,t} - \beta_k m_t)) = 0,$$

which gives

$$Cov(R_i, R_k) = \beta_i\beta_k\sigma^2.$$

This is not really true, but it provides a simple model. A more detailed model would have multiple risk factors. This would require more computation, but still less than computing the covariance of each possible pair of securities in the portfolio. With this equation, only the betas of the individual securities and the market variance need to be estimated to calculate covariance. Hence, the index model greatly reduces the number of calculations that would otherwise have to be made to model a large portfolio of thousands of securities.

== Portfolio optimization ==
The SIM structure is utilized also for portfolio optimization. Here, the above relationship extends to a portfolio, p:

if $E[R_i] = \alpha_i +\beta_i E[Rm]$ then $E[Rp] =\sum_{i} w_i \alpha_i +\beta_p E[Rm]$; where $\beta_p = \sum_{i} w_i \beta_i$ and $E[R_i] = r_{i} - r_f$ per above.

Thus, practically, one holds an "active portfolio", and an index fund, proxying for the overall market.

In determining the optimal weights for the former, the procedure is to calculate an ERB (Excess Return to Beta Ratio) for each stock, and to then rank stocks by ERB in descending order, including only those above a cutoff. The proportion allocated to the active portfolio (and hence the remaining allocation to the market index) depends on the ratio of expected alpha to its variance, scaled by the investor’s risk aversion.

The Treynor–Black model is closely related, although frames the problem slightly differently. The portfolio essentially comprises the index fund combined with a beta-neutral active portfolio constructed from high-alpha securities.

== See also ==
- Capital asset pricing model
- Multiple factor models
- Treynor–Black model
- Markowitz model
