= Online portfolio selection =

Financial stock selection strategy

Online portfolio selection (OPS) is an algorithm-based trading strategy that seeks to optimise investment returns. It was first implemented in 2012 by Bin Li and Bin Hoi at Wuhan University (with the universal portfolio algorithm as predecessor). OPS is contrasted with more traditional approaches to portfolio optimization: while mean-variance optimization seeks to balance risk and return, OPS specifically aims to maximize cumulative wealth, drawing on the Kelly approach to maximizing long-term expected value. Here, OPS sequentially allocates capital among a group of assets, employing, as appropriate, one of several portfolio selection strategies:

- Follow the leader
- Follow the loser
- Fuzzy approach
- Risk assessment
- Follow either winner or loser
- Pattern recognition based
