= Untradable assets =

Untradable assets (or nontraded assets, nonmarketable assets, or perfectly nonliquid assets) are assets that are not traded on the market. Human capital is the most important nontraded assets. Other important nontraded asset classes are private businesses, claims to government transfer payments and claims on trust income.

== Human capital and the Capital Asset Pricing Model ==
Human capital is the stock of knowledge, habits and social and personality attributes. Its market value (discounted value) of future labour income (a measure of human capital) is greater than the total market value of traded assets. Human capital is also the nontraded asset that is most importable across time. Humans can only hedge their human capital using traded assets by borrowing against labour income (via home mortgages) and by reducing uncertainty via life insurance. However, these hedges are imperfect. Therefore, human capital pressures security prices and thus causes deviations from the Capital Asset Pricing Model (CAPM).

== Privately held businesses ==
The market value of privately held corporations and businesses is of a similar magnitude as the market value of human capital. However, privately held businesses can more easily hedged using marketable securities and thus are a lesser source of deviations from the CAPM. Privately held businesses have similar risk characteristics as traded assets. Therefore, individuals can partly offset the diversification problems caused by nontraded private businesses by altering their demands for similar, traded assets.

However, the risks of private businesses do differ from those of traded securities. Therefore, a portfolio of traded assets that best hedges the risk of typical private businesses will enjoy excess demand from private business owners. This will cause the price of the assets in this portfolio to be bid up relative to the price predicted by the CAPM, causing a lower expected return in relation to systematic risk. Conversely, securities with risks highly correlated to the risks of private businesses will have high equilibrium risk premiums, causing a higher expected return in relation to systematic risk; or positive alphas. This has been confirmed by empirical tests by Heaton and Lucas (2000). Thus, private businesses can only be imperfectly hedged using traded securities and therefore still cause deviations from the CAPM.

== The Capital Asset Pricing Model adjusted for human capital ==
The original CAPM equation is

$$E(r_i)= r_f + \frac{E(r_m)-r_f}{\sigma^2(r_m)} cov(r_i,r_m)$$

Where $E$ is the expectations operator, $r_i$ is the end-of-period random yield on the jth asset, $r_m$ is the end-of-period random yield on the market portfolio and $r_f$ is one plus the riskless rate of return.

=== Mayers’ adjusted Capital Asset Pricing Model ===
Mayers (1972) has derived a CAPM for an economy in which nontraded assets exist; specifically, an economy in which individuals are endowed with human capital: labor income of varying size relative to their nonlabor income. This model assumes riskless borrowing and lending, thus implying a linear form of the risk expected return relationship, as does the original CAPM. The adjusted CAPM equation becomes,

$$E(R_i) = E(R_m) \frac{Cov(R_i,R_m ) + \frac{V_H}{V_m} Cov(R_i,R_H)}{\sigma^2(R_m) + \frac{V_H}{V_m} Cov(R_m,R_H)}$$

Where $E$ is the expectations operator, $R_i$ is the excess rate of return of the jth asset ($R_i=r_i-r_f$), $R_m$ is the excess rate of return on the market, $R_H$ is the excess rate of return on aggregate human capital, $V_H$ is the value of aggregate human capital and $V_m$ is the market value of traded assets (the market portfolio).

In the adjusted CAPM, the beta – the measure of systematic risk – is replaced by an adjusted beta that also accounts for covariance with the portfolio of aggregate human capital. Thus, the model creates a wedge between betas measured against the traded, index portfolio and betas measured against the true market portfolio; the latter also includes human capital (as measured by aggregate labor income). This causes the results to differ in two respects.

First, if the $Cov(R_i,R_H)$ is positive (as is expected), the adjusted beta is greater when the CAPM beta is smaller than 1 and vice versa. Thus, it is expected that the risk premium will be greater than predicted by the CAPM for securities with a beta less than one and smaller for securities with a beta greater than 1. This results in a less steep security market line (SML). The ratio of $\frac{V_H}{V_m}$ may be greater than one and thus likely has a significant economic effect. This may be an explanation for the average negative alpha of high-beta securities and positive alpha of low-beta securities that have been empirically found.

Second, in the adjusted CAPM, the portfolios of maximizing investors are not all identical, as is the case in the original CAPM.

=== Jagannathan and Wang’s adjusted Capital Asset Pricing Model ===
Jagannathan and Wang derived an adjusted CAPM where in addition to the beta of the value-weighted stock market index ($\beta^{vw}$), they also estimated the betas of assets with respect to labor income growth ($\beta^{labor}$). As a proxy for changes in the value of human capital they used the rate of change in aggregate labor income. The resulting adjusted CAPM equation becomes

$$E(R_i) = c_0 + c_{size} \ln(ME) + c_{vw} \beta^{vw} + c_{prem} \beta^{prem} + c_{labor} \beta^{labor}$$

where $ME$ is the market value of the firm's total equity

(Note: Jagannathan and Wang also added a beta reflecting the effect of business cycles on asset returns ($\beta^{prem}$).)
