= Erhard Fernholz =

German chemist (1909–1940)

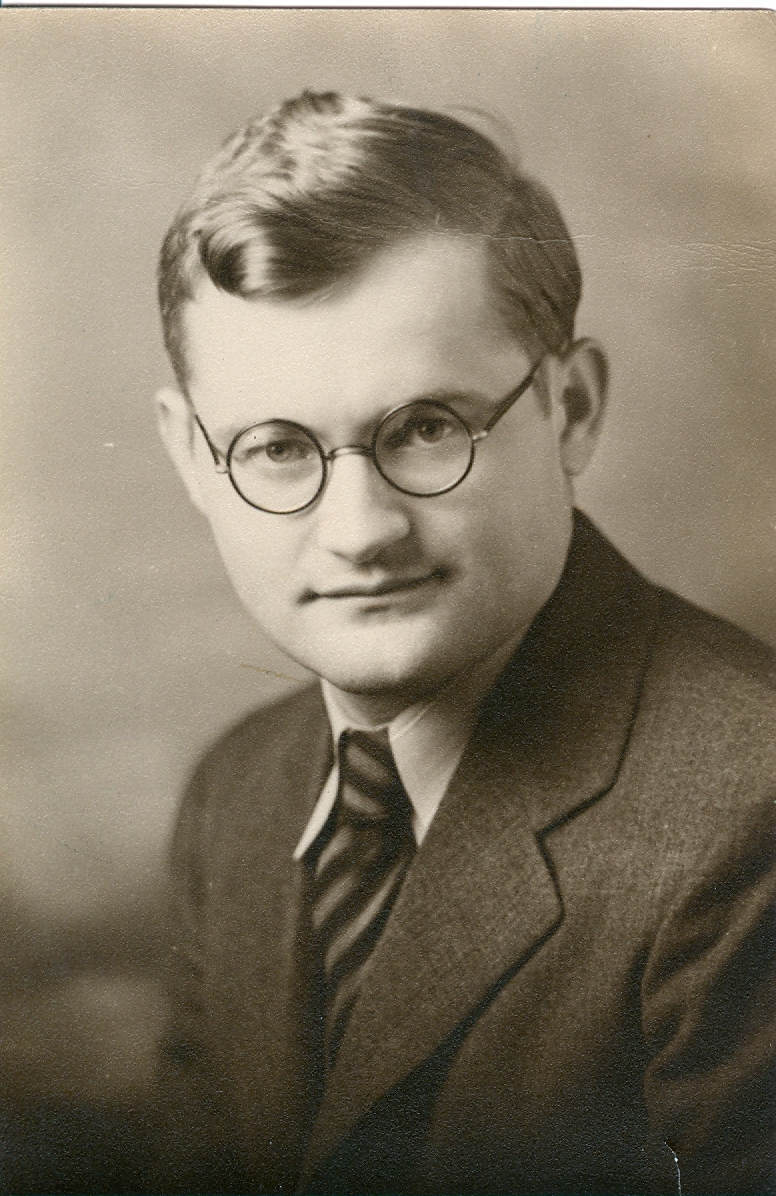
- Born: Friedrich August Erhard Fernholz; 9 June 1909; Hiddenhausen, German Empire
- Died: 14 December 1940 (aged 31); Princeton, New Jersey, U.S.
- Education: University of Göttingen
- Spouse: Mary Briganti (1938–1940)
- Children: E. Robert
- Scientific career
- Fields: Organic chemistry biochemistry
- Doctoral advisor: Adolf Windaus

Friedrich August Erhard Fernholz (9 June 1909 – 14 December 1940) was a German chemist and investigator of sterols and bile acids.

== Biography ==
Erhard Fernholz was the eldest son of Gustav Fernholz and Elisabeth Schwagmeyer, both school teachers in Hiddenhausen where Gustav was also the principal of the local school. Erhard had two younger siblings, Maria Elisabeth and Gustav Johannes Hans, both of whom were also chemists. Erhard Fernholz graduated from the Realgimnasium in 1928 and continued his studies at the University of Göttingen where in 1932, at age 23, he received his PhD degree with highest honors in Chemistry from the Faculty of Mathematics and Natural Sciences. The following year he continued research with his thesis advisor Adolf Windaus and was named university assistant in the Chemistry faculty at Göttingen in charge of the Biochemical Department of the Organic Chemistry Laboratory.

Due to his opposition to Nazism, Fernholz left Germany for the United States in 1935 by virtue of a fellowship he had received from Princeton University to work in the Chemistry Department with Prof. E. S. Wallis. During his brief career, Fernholz contributed more than forty papers to the chemical literature and established himself at an early age as an outstanding investigator. His research was mainly concentrated on sterols and bile acids, and his work on stigma-sterol contributed to the first partial synthesis of progesterone.

After a year at Princeton University, Fernholz joined the research group at Merck & Co., and in 1937 he reported the isolation of durohydroquinone from the thermal decomposition products of α-tocopherol, the most active principle of Vitamin E. This research was followed by the complete structure of α-tocopherol that Fernholz presented in 1938, based almost entirely on the basis of his own experiments. That same year Fernholz became head of the division of Organic Chemistry of the newly founded Squibb Institute for Medical Research. In addition to his research contributions in the sterol area, he explored the anti-hemorrhagic properties of natural substances including pioneering work on Vitamin K.

His career came to an abrupt end on 14 December 1940 when Fernholz disappeared at age 31 while walking his spaniels in Princeton, New Jersey. Soon after this incident, both the FBI and police from eight states joined in the investigation as it was rumored that Nazi agents may have been involved in his disappearance. However, by March 1941, after an FBI investigation, it was concluded that Fernholz had died as a result of an accidental drowning in nearby Carnegie Lake and that no foul play was involved.

== Family ==
In September 1938, Fernholz married Mary Briganti, a research assistant in the Economics Department at Princeton University. In March 1941, three months after his death, his only son Erhard Robert was born. E. Robert Fernholz is former Chief Investment Officer of INTECH, an institutional equity management firm that he founded in 1987. He has published articles in mathematics, statistics, and mathematical finance, including the research monograph Stochastic Portfolio Theory in 2002.
