= Robert Fernholz =

American mathematician and financial researcher (born 1941)

- Born: March 27, 1941; Princeton, United States
- Education: Princeton University; Columbia University
- Spouse: Luisa Turrin
- Children: Daniel, Ricardo
- Scientific career
- Fields: Mathematical Finance
- Doctoral advisor: Lipman Bers

Robert Fernholz (born Erhard Robert Fernholz, March 27, 1941) is a mathematician and financial researcher specializing in mathematics of finance. He founded INTECH, an institutional equity management firm, in 1987 where he was its chief investment officer. He is also the President of Allocation Strategies, LLC, a company that he founded in 2012.

== Early life and education ==
Robert Fernholz is the only child of Erhard Fernholz (1909-1940) and Mary Briganti Fernholz (1905 -1994). He was born in Princeton, New Jersey, on March 27, 1941. His father, Erhard Fernholz, was a distinguished German chemist who fled Germany and immigrated to the US in 1935 to join the faculty of Princeton University. Fernholz's mother, Mary Briganti Fernholz, was the daughter of Italian Immigrants that came to the US in the early 1900s. She held an Ms degree in economics from Smith College and worked at Princeton University as a research assistant in the Economics Department.

Fernholz grew up in Princeton and attended Princeton Country Day School to continue high school at Deerfield Academy in Massachusetts, graduating in 1958. As an undergraduate at Princeton University, he majored in mathematics under the direction of William Feller and received his BA degree magna cum laude in 1962. He continued with graduate studies in mathematics at Columbia University where he earned his PhD in 1967, with a thesis under the direction of Lipman Bers.

== Career ==
After joining the Mathematics Department at the University of Washington in Seattle as an assistant professor, Fernholz continued his academic career in Argentina, followed by Hunter College of the CUNY, and culminating with one year at Princeton University. During these years his interests changed from pure to applied mathematics, in particular, probability, statistics, and applications.

After several years of independent research in this new direction, in 1982 he published the paper "Stochastic Portfolio Theory and Stochastic Market Equilibrium", which was the basis for his investment ideas that culminated in the creation of INTECH.

Fernholz is the author of numerous research articles both in pure and applied mathematics as well as statistics and mathematics of finance. His most important publication is the pioneering research monograph Stochastic Portfolio Theory published in 2002. He is a trustee at the Institute for Advanced Study in Princeton, New Jersey.

== Personal life ==
Robert Fernholz married Luisa Turrin in 1970 and they have two sons: Daniel and Ricardo. Luisa Turrin Fernholz earned a PhD in statistics from Rutgers University and is professor emerita in Statistics at Temple University. Daniel T. Fernholz holds a PhD in Computer Science from the University of Texas at Austin, and Ricardo T. Fernholz earned a PhD in economics from the University of California, Berkeley and is currently associate professor of economics at Claremont McKenna College.
