= Separation property =

Separation property may refer to:

- Separation property (finance), a concept used to simplify the process of building a portfolio of financial assets
- Prewellordering in mathematics, a component of set theory
- Separation axiom in mathematics, a concept in topology
