= Risk return ratio =

Mathematical ratio used in investing

The risk–return ratio is a measure of return of investment in terms of risk for a specific time period. The percentage return (R) for the time period is measured in a straightforward way:

$$R=\frac{P_{end}-P_{start}}{P_{start}}$$

where $P_{start}$ and $P_{end}$ simply refer to the price by the start and end of the time period.

The risk is measured as the percentage maximum drawdown (MDD) for the specific period:

$$\textit{MDD}=\max_{t\in(start,end)}(DD_t)\text{ where }DD_t=\begin{cases} \displaystyle 1-(1-DD_{t-1})\frac{P_t}{P_{t-1}}&\text{if }P_t-P_{t-1}<0\\ 0&\text{otherwise}\end{cases}$$

where DD_{t}, DD_{t−1}, P_{t} and P_{t−1} refer to the drawdown (DD) and prices (P) at a specific point in time, t, or the time right before that, t−1.

The risk–return ratio is then defined and measured, for a specific time period, as:

$$RRR=\frac{R}{\textit{MDD}}$$

Note that dividing a percentage numerator by a percentage denominator renders a single number. This RRR number is a measure of the return in terms of risk. It is fully comparable, i.e. it is possible to compare the RRR for one share with the RRR of another share, just as long as it is the same time period.

The RRR as defined here is formally the same as the so-called MER ratio, and shares some similarities with the Calmar ratio, the Sterling ratio and the Burke ratio. However, the RRR can arguably be regarded as more general than the MER ratio since it can be used for any time interval even daily or intra-day prices, while the MER ratio seems to be confined to measuring only the risk and return of a fund since inception until the current date. It is also less ad hoc than the Calmar, the Sterling and the Burke ratios.

The RRR was first defined and popularized by Dr. Richard CB Johnsson in his investment newsletter.

== Relation to risk-adjusted performance measures ==
The risk–return ratio is related to broader measures of risk-adjusted return, which compare investment performance with the amount or type of risk taken to achieve it. Commonly used measures include the Sharpe ratio, which relates excess return to return volatility, and the information ratio, which compares active return with tracking error.

Drawdown-based measures use losses from prior peaks as the measure of risk rather than volatility. The Calmar ratio, for example, divides compounded annualized growth by maximum drawdown over the same period, but it is not generally scaled across different time periods in the same way as volatility-based measures.

== See also ==
- Risk–return spectrum
