= Calmar ratio =

Calculation of investment performance

Calmar ratio (or Drawdown ratio) is a performance measurement used to evaluate Commodity Trading Advisors and hedge funds. It was created by Terry W. Young and first published in 1991 in the trade journal Futures.

Young owned California Managed Accounts, a firm in Santa Ynez, California, which managed client funds and published the newsletter CMA Reports. The name of his ratio "Calmar" is an acronym of his company's name and its newsletter: CALifornia Managed Accounts Reports. Young defined it thus:

The Calmar ratio uses a slightly modified Sterling ratio – average annual rate of return for the last 36 months divided by the maximum drawdown for the last 36 months – and calculates it on a monthly basis, instead of the Sterling ratio's yearly basis.

Young believed the Calmar ratio was superior because

The Calmar ratio changes gradually and serves to smooth out the overachievement and underachievement periods of a CTA's performance more readily than either the Sterling or Sharpe ratios.

It should be mentioned that a competitor newsletter, Managed Account Reports (founded in 1979 by publisher Leon Rose), had previously defined and popularized another performance measurement, the MAR Ratio, equal to the compound annual return from inception, divided by the maximum drawdown from inception.

Although the Calmar ratio and MAR ratio are sometimes assumed to be identical, they are in fact different: Calmar ratio uses 36 months of performance data, whereas MAR ratio uses all performance data from inception onwards. Later versions of the Calmar ratio introduce the risk free rate into the numerator to create a Sharpe type ratio.

== Interpretation and limitations ==
The Calmar ratio is interpreted as a measure of return earned relative to historical drawdown risk. A higher Calmar ratio indicates more annualised return per unit of maximum drawdown, while a lower ratio indicates weaker performance relative to the largest peak-to-trough decline over the measurement period.

A limitation of the ratio is that it is sensitive to the selected time period. Because maximum drawdown is measured over a specific interval, comparisons between funds or strategies are most meaningful when the same start and end dates are used. Maximum drawdown also captures only the largest historical decline, so it is often considered alongside other drawdown and performance measures rather than as a complete measure of risk-adjusted performance.

== See also ==
- Modigliani risk-adjusted performance
- Omega ratio
- Risk return ratio
- Sharpe ratio
- Sterling ratio
- Sortino ratio
