= Security characteristic line =

Risk-calculating regression line

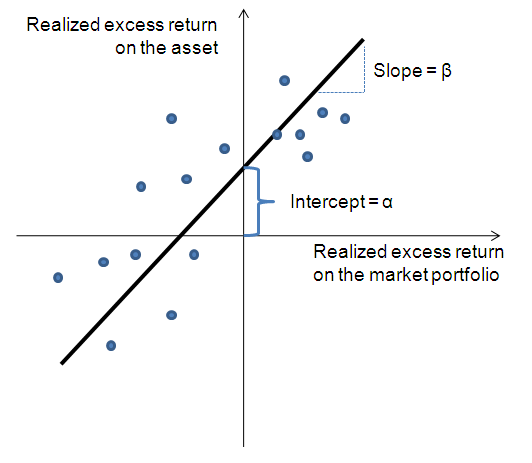
Security characteristic line Positive abnormal return (α): Above-average returns that cannot be explained as compensation for added risk Negative abnormal returns (α): Below-average returns that cannot be explained by below-market risk

Security characteristic line (SCL) is a regression line, plotting performance of a particular security or portfolio against that of the market portfolio at every point in time. The SCL is plotted on a graph where the Y-axis is the excess return on a security over the risk-free return and the X-axis is the excess return of the market in general. The slope of the SCL is the security's beta, and the intercept is its alpha.

== Formula ==
$$\mathrm{SCL} : R_{i,t} - R_{f} = \alpha_i + \beta_i\,  ( R_{M,t} - R_{f} ) + \epsilon_{i,t}$$

where:

α_{i} is called the asset's alpha (abnormal return)
β_{i}(R_{M,t} – R_{f}) is a nondiversifiable or systematic risk
ε_{i,t} is the non-systematic or diversifiable, non-market or idiosyncratic risk
R_{M,t} is the return to market portfolio
R_{f} is a risk-free rate

== See also ==
- Security market line
- Capital allocation line
- Capital market line
- Modern portfolio theory
