= Security market line =

Representation of the capital asset pricing model

Security market line

Security market line (SML) is the representation of the capital asset pricing model. It displays the expected rate of return of an individual security as a function of systematic, non-diversifiable risk. The risk of an individual risky security reflects the volatility of the return from the security rather than the return of the market portfolio. The risk in these individual risky securities reflects the systematic risk.

== Formula ==
The Y-intercept of the SML is equal to the risk-free interest rate. The slope of the SML is equal to the market risk premium and reflects the risk return tradeoff at a given time:

$$\mathrm{SML} : E(R_i) = R_f + \beta_{i}[E(R_M) - R_f]\,$$

where:

E(R_{i}) is an expected return on security
E(R_{M}) is an expected return on market portfolio M
β is a nondiversifiable or systematic risk
R_{M} is a market rate of return
R_{f} is a risk-free rate

When used in portfolio management, the SML represents the investment's opportunity cost (investing in a combination of the market portfolio and the risk-free asset). All the correctly priced securities are plotted on the SML. The assets above the line are undervalued because for a given amount of risk (beta), they yield a higher return. The assets below the line are overvalued because for a given amount of risk, they yield a lower return. In a market in perfect equilibrium, all securities would fall on the SML.

There is a question about what the SML looks like when beta is negative. A rational investor will accept these assets even though they yield sub-risk-free returns, because they will provide "recession insurance" as part of a well-diversified portfolio. Therefore, the SML continues in a straight line whether beta is positive or negative. A different way of thinking about this is that the absolute value of beta represents the amount of risk associated with the asset, while the sign explains when the risk occurs.

== Security Market Line, Treynor ratio and Alpha ==
All of the portfolios on the SML have the same Treynor ratio as does the market portfolio, i.e.

$$\frac{E(R_i) - R_f}{\beta_i} =E(R_M) - R_f.$$

In fact, the slope of the SML is the Treynor ratio of the market portfolio since $\beta_M=1$.

A stock picking rule of thumb for assets with positive beta is to buy if the Treynor ratio will be above the SML and sell if it will be below (see figure above). Indeed, from the efficient market hypothesis, it follows that we cannot beat the market. Therefore, all assets should have a Treynor ratio less than or equal to that of the market. In consequence, if there is an asset whose Treynor ratio will be bigger than the market's then this asset gives more return for unit of systematic risk (i.e. beta), which contradicts the efficient market hypothesis.

This abnormal extra return above the market's return at a given level of risk is what is called the alpha.

== See also ==
- Capital allocation line
- Capital market line
- Efficient frontier
- Market portfolio
- Modern portfolio theory
- Security characteristic line
