= Adolf Windaus =

German chemist (1876–1959)

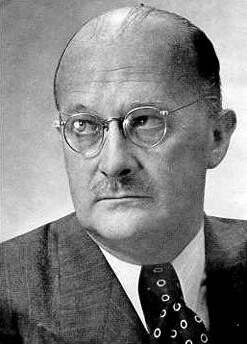
- Born: Adolf Otto Reinhold Windaus; 25 December 1876; Berlin, German Empire
- Died: 9 June 1959 (aged 82); Göttingen, West Germany
- Known for: Synthesis of vitamin D
- Awards: Pour le Mérite for Sciences and Arts (1952); Goethe Medal (1941); Nobel Prize for Chemistry (1928)
- Scientific career
- Fields: Organic chemistry biochemistry
- Doctoral advisor: Heinrich Kiliani
- Doctoral students: Adolf Butenandt; Erhard Fernholz

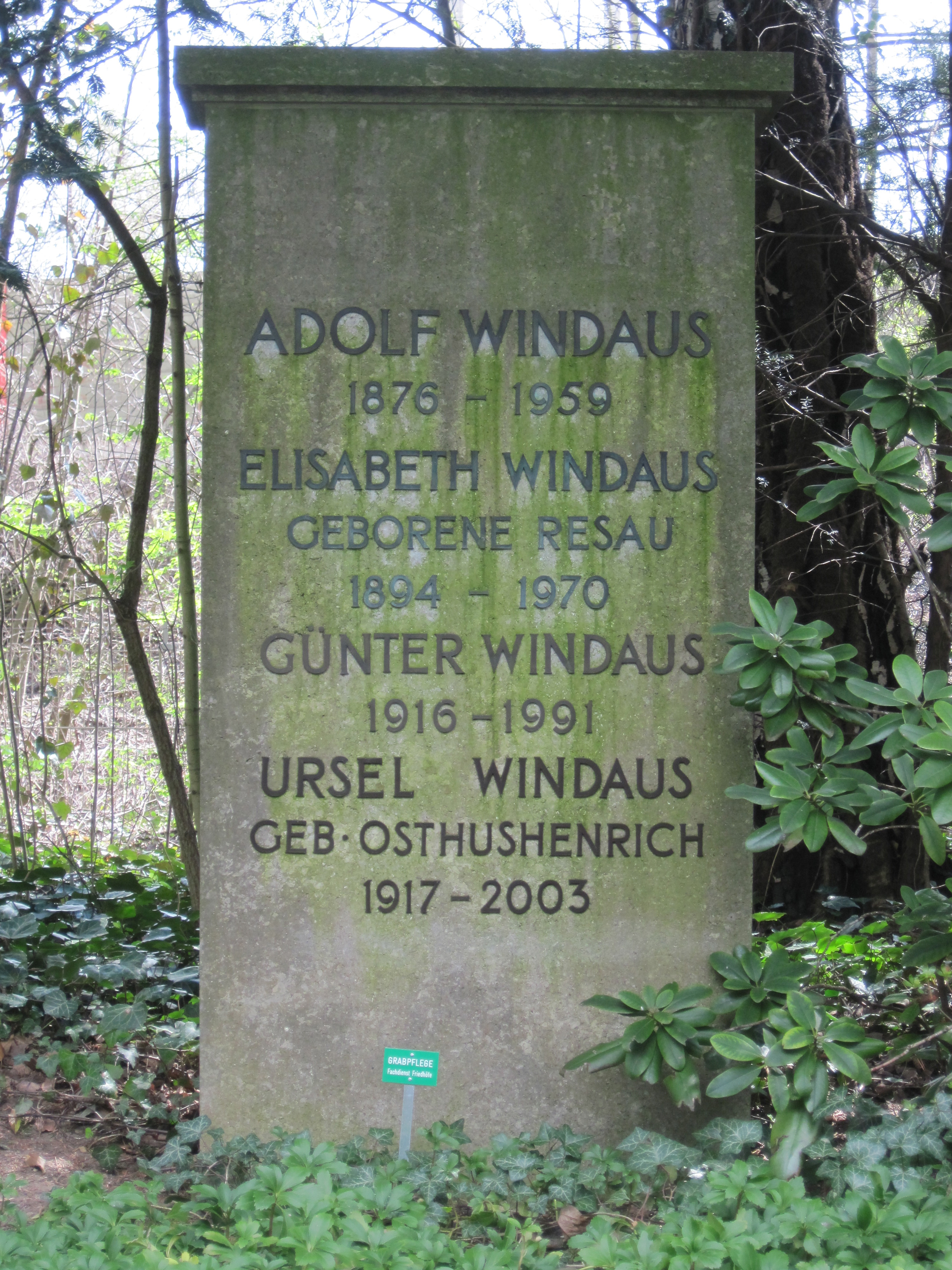
Adolf Windaus' grave in Göttingen

Adolf Otto Reinhold Windaus (German pronunciation: [ˈaːdɔlf ˈvɪndaʊs]; 25 December 1876 – 9 June 1959) was a German chemist who won a Nobel Prize in Chemistry in 1928 for his work on sterols and their relation to vitamins. He was the doctoral advisor of Adolf Butenandt who also won a Nobel Prize in Chemistry in 1939.

== Biography ==
He was born in Berlin, Germany, on 25 December 1876 to a family who owned a drapery business. He attended a prestigious French grammar school, where he focused primarily on literature. Windaus began studying medicine at the University of Berlin in about 1895 then proceeded to study chemistry at the University of Freiburg. He married Elizabeth Resau in 1915, and they had three children together, Günter, Gustav, and Margarete. After earning his PhD in medicine, Windaus became the head of the chemical institute at the University of Göttingen from 1915 to 1944. Throughout his life, Windaus won many awards, including the Goethe Medal, the Pasteur Medal, and the Nobel Prize for Chemistry. In addition to his many accomplishments and discoveries in science, Windaus was also one of the very few German chemists who did not work with the Nazis and openly opposed their regime. As the head of the chemical institute at the University of Göttingen, Windaus personally defended one of his Jewish graduate students from dismissal. Windaus believed that while every man had a moral code, his science was motivated by curiosity, and was not driven by politics, ethics, and applications of his discoveries. This viewpoint caused Windaus to decline to research poison gas during World War I.

== Research ==
He was involved in the discovery of the transformation of cholesterol through several steps to vitamin D_{3} (Cholecalciferol). He gave his patents to Merck and Bayer and they brought out the medical Vigantol in 1927.

Sterols

Windaus began his research by studying sterols. In particular, Windaus studied cholesterol, which is the best known sterol. Sterols are nitrogen-free secondary alcohols with high molecular weight that contain alicylic systems, or hydrocarbon rings. Cholesterol was first discovered in human gallstones and is a mono-unsaturated alcohol found in all higher animals, both as a free alcohol and fatty acid ester. Windaus was fascinated by how cholesterol levels in the body fluctuate, in particular how it increases during pregnancy and decreases during disease. He researched sterols in insects, echinodermata, and sponges, called zoosterols. Many of these zoosterols have the same formula as cholesterol, except for spongosterol, which is a saturated sterol and more different from cholesterol than the other zoosterols. In plants, the sterols are known as phytosterols. Windaus found that the most common phytosterols are sitosterols, which have the same formula as cholesterol. There are also saturated phytosterols that are mixed in with these unsaturated sitosterols in small quantities. There are also alcohol-like phytosterols, which contain one more hydroxyl group than sitosterols and a different number of carbons. Mycosterols are sterols which are found in fungi. Ergosterol is one significant mycosterol as it has three double bonds, in comparison to the one double bond in cholesterol. In his research, Windaus did not find sterols to exist in bacteria, which he found to be surprising. This research of the composition of sterols, along with their connection to vitamins, earned Windaus the Nobel Prize in Chemistry in 1928.

Vitamin D2 and D3

Rickets, a bone disease resulting from vitamin D deficiency, was originally treated in the early 1900s through essential dietary factors such as whole milk or cod-liver oil. It was also postulated that increase sunlight was improving conditions, but was improperly concluded that cholesterol was the precursor activated via UV light. In testing this, investigators under Windaus’ instruction found that completely pure cholesterol - converted into its dibromide and recrystallized - had lost its antirachitic effects upon irradiation. It was then postulated that a different substance associated with 'chemically pure' cholesterol through all usual stages of purification is the precursor to vitamin D.

The impurity was able to precipitate with digitonin, showing chemical properties of a steroid with three double bonds. The three UV absorption peaks (see image) of the active impurity was used to purify, and become highly concentrated through high-vacuum distillation and charcoal adsorption techniques. In evaluating a variety of sterols that showed antirachitic activity upon irradiation, done so in consultation with A.F. Hess, O. Rosenheim, and T.A. Webster, ergosterol (see image)- Ca27H42 – was found to be the only precursor of vitamin D, convertible under wavelength between 253 and 302 nm. Similarities of ergosterol to that of the active fraction from cholesterol included similar UV spectrums, rapid destruction by oxidation, and production of the same color reaction with sulfuric acid.

This production of Vitamin D2, or calciferol (see image), was a complete cure to rachitis – 100,000 times more effective than fish liver oil – and Windaus and his group were able to determine its chemical properties. This included being isomeric with ergosterol with a hydroxyl group and three conjugated double bonds; the correct structure was confirmed in 1936.The possibility of polymerization was tested to be inaccurate through evaluating the molecular weight, and were also able to denounce certain isomerization. The secondary alcohol displacing to a double bond via Zerewitinoff's method (see image) was shown to not occur, as well as the double bond transforming to a steric rearrangement didn't occur under observance of titration and catalytic hydrogenation. Ergosterol was originally found in fungi and not animal organisms, so the question of obtaining Vitamin D from sunlight was still in question and studied by Windaus long after receiving the Nobel Prize. In isolating and identifying 7-dehydrocholesterol in hog skin, and later human skin, whole milk, and animal liver, it too was antirachitic upon irradiation. This was already a known compound derived from cholesterol, and the new irradiation product was named Vitamin D3, or cholecalciferol (see image). Windaus established the structure by investigating the photochemical reactions within its formation.

vitamin D_{3}

7-Dehydrocholesterol
