= Capital allocation line =

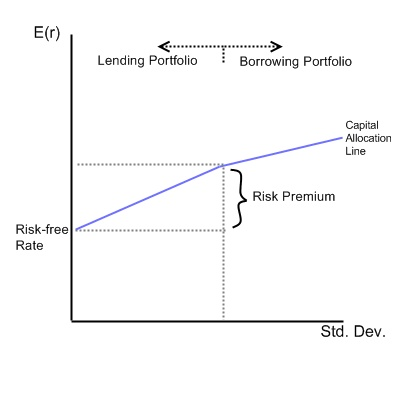
An example capital allocation line. As illustrated by the article, the slope dictates the amount of return that comes with a certain level of risk.

Capital allocation line (CAL) is a graph created by investors to measure the risk of risky and risk-free assets. The graph displays the return to be made by taking on a certain level of risk. Its slope is known as the "reward-to-variability ratio".

== Formula ==
The capital allocation line is a straight line that has the following equation:

$$\mathrm{CAL} : E(r_{C}) = r_F + \sigma_C  \frac{E(r_P) - r_F}{\sigma_P}$$

In this formula P is the risky portfolio, F is riskless portfolio, and C is a combination of portfolios P and F.

The slope of the capital allocation line is equal to the incremental return of the portfolio to the incremental increase of risk. Hence, the slope of the capital allocation line is called the reward-to-variability ratio because the expected return increases continually with the increase of risk as measured by the standard deviation.

== Derivation ==
If investors can purchase a risk free asset with some return r_{F}, then all correctly priced risky assets or portfolios will have expected return of the form

$${E(R_P)} = r_F + b  \sigma_P$$

where b is some incremental return to offset the risk (sometimes known as a risk premium), and σ_{P} is the risk itself expressed as the standard deviation. By rearranging, we can see the risk premium has the following value

$$b = \frac{E(R_P) - r_F}{\sigma_P}$$

Now consider the case of another portfolio that is a combination of a risk free asset and the correctly priced portfolio we considered above (which is itself just another risky asset). If it is correctly priced, it will have exactly the same form:

$$E(R_C) = r_F + \sigma_C  b$$

Substituting in our derivation for the risk premium above:

$$E(R_C) = r_F + \sigma_C \frac{E(R_P) - r_F}{\sigma_P}$$

This yields the Capital Allocation Line.

== See also ==
- Capital market line
- Security market line
- Security characteristic line
- Market portfolio
- Sharpe ratio, which equals the slope of the Capital Allocation Line
