= Haryana Republican Party =

- Abbreviation: HRP

Haryana Republican Party, political party in the Indian state of Haryana. The party was founded on 30 December 2003 when the sole Republican Party of India member of the Haryana assembly, Karan Singh Dalal, broke away. On the same day Democratic Congress Party was founded as well.

Many saw HRP as a quasiparty, whose raison d'etre was to provide a loop-hole for the Anti-Defection Law as Dalal wanted to join Indian National Congress. After the Lok Sabha elections 2004 Dalal merged his HRP with Congress. But the speaker of the Haryana assembly reacted and suspended Dalal (and five other assembly members who had joined Congress) under the Anti-Defection Law. Thus the attempt on behalf of Congress to gain majority in the assembly failed.
