= Universal portfolio algorithm =

Portfolio selection algorithm

The universal portfolio algorithm is a portfolio selection algorithm from the field of machine learning and information theory. The algorithm learns adaptively from historical data and maximizes log-optimal growth rate in the long run, per the Kelly criterion. It was introduced by the late Stanford University information theorist Thomas M. Cover.

The algorithm rebalances the portfolio at the beginning of each trading period. At the beginning of the first trading period it starts with a naive diversification. In the following trading periods the portfolio composition depends on the historical total return of all possible constant-rebalanced portfolios.

The universal portfolio algorithm is the predecessor of the various online portfolio selection methodologies.
