= Efficient frontier =

Investment portfolio which occupies the "efficient" parts of the risk-return spectrum

Efficient Frontier. The hyperbola is sometimes referred to as the "Markowitz bullet", and its upward sloped portion is the efficient frontier if no risk-free asset is available. With a risk-free asset, the straight capital allocation line is the efficient frontier.

In modern portfolio theory, the efficient frontier (or portfolio frontier) is an investment portfolio which occupies the "efficient" parts of the risk–return spectrum. Formally, it is the set of portfolios which satisfy the condition that no other portfolio exists with a higher expected return but with the same standard deviation of return (i.e., the risk). The efficient frontier was first formulated by Harry Markowitz in 1952; see Markowitz model.

== Overview ==
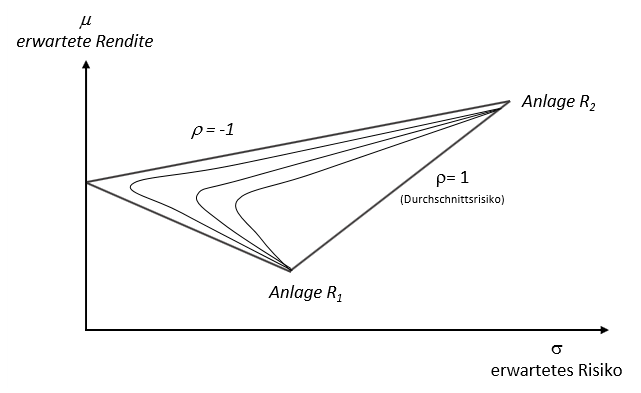
Parametric plot (as a function of weights $\beta$) of the expected return and the expected risk for different correlations. The efficient frontier is the upper part of the corresponding curves.

A combination of assets, i.e. a portfolio, is referred to as "efficient" if it has the best possible expected level of return for its level of risk (which is represented by the standard deviation of the portfolio's return). Here, every possible combination of risky assets can be plotted in risk–expected return space, and the collection of all such possible portfolios defines a region in this space. In the absence of the opportunity to hold a risk-free asset, this region is the opportunity set (the feasible set). The positively sloped (upward-sloped) top boundary of this region is a portion of a hyperbola, and is called the "efficient frontier".

If a risk-free asset is also available, the opportunity set is larger, and its upper boundary, the efficient frontier, is a straight line segment emanating from the vertical axis at the value of the risk-free asset's return and tangent to the risky-assets-only opportunity set. All portfolios between the risk-free asset and the tangency portfolio are portfolios composed of risk-free assets and the tangency portfolio, while all portfolios on the linear frontier above and to the right of the tangency portfolio are generated by borrowing at the risk-free rate and investing the proceeds into the tangency portfolio.

== Minimum-variance and tangency portfolios ==
On the efficient frontier, the portfolio with the lowest possible risk is known as the minimum-variance portfolio. Corporate Finance Institute describes the minimum-variance portfolio as the combination of risky assets that minimizes standard deviation, and identifies it as the point where the efficient frontier begins.

When a risk-free asset is introduced, the efficient set is no longer limited to the upper portion of the Markowitz frontier. In that case, the relevant portfolio of risky assets is the 'tangency portfolio, which is the portfolio where the capital allocation line is tangent to the efficient frontier. The same source describes this portfolio as the optimal market portfolio in the standard MPT framework.

== See also ==
- Markowitz model
- Modern portfolio theory
- Critical line method, an optimization algorithm developed by Markowitz for this problem
- Portfolio optimization
- Resampled efficient frontier, accounting for the uncertainty of the risk and return estimates using resampling
