= Human Rights Party =

Human Rights Party or similar may refer to:

- Unity for Human Rights Party, in Albania
- Human Rights Party (Australia), in New South Wales
- Human Rights Party (Cambodia)
- For Human Rights in United Latvia
- Human Rights Party (Malaysia)
- Human Rights Party (New Zealand)
- Human Rights Protection Party, in Samoa
- Human Rights Party (United States), in Michigan
