= Market portfolio =

Market portfolio is an investment portfolio that theoretically consisting of a weighted sum of every asset in the market, with weights in the proportions that they exist in the market, with the necessary assumption that these assets are infinitely divisible.

The concept is related to asset allocation and has been critiqued by some economists. In practice index providers and exchange-traded funds (ETF) providers create proxies of a market portfolio using securities that are available on securities exchanges in proportion of their weighting.

== Critiques ==
Richard Roll's critique states that this is only a theoretical concept, as to create a market portfolio for investment purposes in practice would necessarily include every single possible available asset, including real estate, precious metals, stamp collections, jewelry, and anything with any worth, as the theoretical market being referred to would be the world market.

There is some question of whether what is used for the market portfolio really matters. Some authors say that it does not make a big difference; you can use any representative index and get similar results. Roll gave an example where different indexes produce much different results, and that by choosing the index you can get any ranking you want. Brown and Brown (1987) examine this, using different indexes such as stocks only, stocks and bonds, and stocks plus bonds plus real estate. They find that using a market that includes real estate produces much different results. For example, with one measurement most mutual funds have alpha close to zero, while with another measurement most of them have significantly negative alpha.

Most index providers give indices for different components such as stocks only, bonds only, et cetera. As a result, proxies for the market (such as the FTSE 100 in the UK, DAX in Germany or the S&P 500 in the US) are used in practice by investors. Roll's critique states that these proxies cannot provide an accurate representation of the entire market.

The concept of a market portfolio plays an important role in many financial theories and models, including the capital asset pricing model where it is the only fund in which investors need to invest, to be supplemented only by a risk-free asset, depending upon each investor's attitude towards risk.

Sharpe (2010) notes that many investors are at least targeted to a fixed ratio (e.g. 60% stocks, 40% bonds). He points out that this is sort of contrarian. The holdings of all investors combined must, by equation, be in the cap-weighted proportions. So many investors following this strategy implies some other investors must follow a buy-high, sell-low (trend following) strategy. He then says that he doesn't like it and people should use adjustments to the market proportions instead.

The portfolio of the average investor contains important information for strategic asset allocation purposes. This portfolio shows the relative value of all assets according to the market crowd, which one could interpret as a benchmark for the average investor. Several authors have collected data to determine the composition of the global market portfolio since 1960.

The returns on the market portfolio realizes a compounded real return of 4.43% with a standard deviation of 11.2% from 1960 until 2017. In the inflationary period from 1960 to 1979, the compounded real return of the GMP is 3.24%, while this is 6.01% in the disinflationary period from 1980 to 2017. The reward for the average investor is a compounded return of 3.39%-points above the risk-free rate.

== See also ==
- Asset allocation
- Capital market line
- Capital allocation line
- Security market line
- Security characteristic line
