= Pseudospectral knotting method =

Optimal control technique

In applied mathematics, the pseudospectral knotting method is a generalization and enhancement of the standard pseudospectral method for optimal control. Introduced by I. Michael Ross and F. Fahroo in 2004, it forms part of the collection of the Ross–Fahroo pseudospectral methods.

== Definition ==
According to Ross and Fahroo, a pseudospectral (PS) knot is a double Lobatto point; i.e. two boundary points coinciding. At this point, information (such as discontinuities, jumps, dimension changes etc.) is exchanged between two standard PS methods. This information exchange is used to solve some of the most difficult problems in optimal control, known as hybrid optimal control problems.

In a hybrid optimal control problem, an optimal control problem is intertwined with a graph problem. A standard pseudospectral optimal control method is incapable of solving such problems; however, through the use of pseudospectral knots, the graph information can be encoded at the double Lobatto points, thereby allowing a hybrid optimal control problem to be discretized and solved using powerful software such as DIDO.

== Applications ==
PS knots have found applications in various aerospace problems such as the ascent guidance of launch vehicles and advancing the Aldrin Cycler using solar sails. PS knots have also been used for anti-aliasing of PS optimal control solutions and for capturing critical information in switches when solving bang-bang-type optimal control problems.

== Software ==
The PS knotting method was first implemented in the MATLAB optimal control software package, DIDO.

== See also ==
- Legendre pseudospectral method
- Chebyshev pseudospectral method
- Ross–Fahroo lemma
- Ross' π lemma
- Ross–Fahroo pseudospectral methods
