= Legendre pseudospectral method =

The Legendre pseudospectral method for optimal control problems is based on Legendre polynomials. It is part of the larger theory of pseudospectral optimal control, a term coined by Ross. A basic version of the Legendre pseudospectral was originally proposed by Elnagar and his coworkers in 1995. Since then, Ross, Fahroo and their coworkers have extended, generalized and applied the method for a large range of problems. An application that has received wide publicity is the use of their method for generating real time trajectories for the International Space Station.

== Fundamentals ==
There are three basic types of Legendre pseudospectral methods:

1. One based on Gauss-Lobatto points
  1. First proposed by Elnagar et al and subsequently extended by Fahroo and Ross to incorporate the covector mapping theorem.
  2. Forms the basis for solving general nonlinear finite-horizon optimal control problems.
  3. Incorporated in several software products
    - DIDO, OTIS, PSOPT
2. One based on Gauss-Radau points
  1. First proposed by Fahroo and Ross and subsequently extended (by Fahroo and Ross) to incorporate a covector mapping theorem.
  2. Forms the basis for solving general nonlinear infinite-horizon optimal control problems.
  3. Forms the basis for solving general nonlinear finite-horizon problems with one free endpoint.
3. One based on Gauss points
  1. First proposed by Reddien
  2. Forms the basis for solving finite-horizon problems with free endpoints
  3. Incorporated in several software products
    - GPOPS, PROPT

== Software ==
The first software to implement the Legendre pseudospectral method was DIDO in 2001. Subsequently, the method was incorporated in the NASA code OTIS. Years later, many other software products emerged at an increasing pace, such as PSOPT, PROPT and GPOPS.

== Flight implementations ==
The Legendre pseudospectral method (based on Gauss-Lobatto points) has been implemented in flight by NASA on several spacecraft through the use of the software, DIDO. The first flight implementation was on November 5, 2006, when NASA used DIDO to maneuver the International Space Station to perform the Zero Propellant Maneuver. The Zero Propellant Maneuver was discovered by Nazareth Bedrossian using DIDO. Watch a video of this historic maneuver.

== See also ==
- DIDO
- Chebyshev pseudospectral method
- Ross–Fahroo pseudospectral methods
- Ross–Fahroo lemma
- Covector mapping principle
