= PROPT =

- Developer: Tomlab Optimization Inc.
- Stable release: 7.8 / December 16, 2011
- Operating system: TOMLAB - OS Support
- Type: Technical computing
- License: Proprietary
- Website: PROPT product page

The PROPT MATLAB Optimal Control Software is a new generation platform for solving applied optimal control (with ODE or DAE formulation) and parameters estimation problems.

The platform was developed by MATLAB Programming Contest Winner, Per Rutquist in 2008. The most recent version has support for binary and integer variables as well as an automated scaling module.

== Description ==
PROPT is a combined modeling, compilation and solver engine, built upon the TomSym modeling class, for generation of highly complex optimal control problems. PROPT uses a pseudospectral Collocation method (with Gauss or Chebyshev points) for solving optimal control problems. This means that the solution takes the form of a Polynomial, and this polynomial satisfies the DAE and the path constraints at the collocation points.

In general PROPT has the following main functions:

- Computation of the constant matrices used for the differentiation and integration of the polynomials used to approximate the solution to the Trajectory optimization problem.
- Source transformation to turn user-supplied expressions into MATLAB code for the cost function $f$ and constraint function $c$ that are passed to a Nonlinear programming solver in TOMLAB. The source transformation package TomSym automatically generates first and second order derivatives.
- Functionality for plotting and computing a variety of information for the solution to the problem.
- Automatic detection of the following:
  - Linear and quadratic objective.
  - Simple bounds, linear and nonlinear constraints.
  - Non-optimized expressions.
- Integrated support for non-smooth (hybrid) optimal control problems.
- Module for automatic scaling of difficult space related problem.
- Support for binary and integer variables, controls or states.

== Modeling ==
The PROPT system uses the TomSym symbolic source transformation engine to model optimal control problems. It is possible to define independent variables, dependent functions, scalars and constant parameters:

 toms tf
 toms t
 p = tomPhase('p', t, 0, tf, 30);
 x0 = {tf == 20};
 cbox = {10 <= tf <= 40};

 toms z1
 cbox = {cbox; 0 <= z1 <= 500};
 x0 = {x0; z1 == 0};

 ki0 = [1e3; 1e7; 10; 1e-3];

=== States and controls ===
States and controls only differ in the sense that states need be continuous between phases.

 tomStates x1
 x0 = {icollocate({x1 == 0})};

 tomControls u1
 cbox = {-2 <= collocate(u1) <= 1};
 x0 = {x0; collocate(u1 == -0.01)};

=== Boundary, path, event and integral constraints ===
A variety of boundary, path, event and integral constraints are shown below:

 cbnd = initial(x1 == 1);       % Starting point for x1
 cbnd = final(x1 == 1);         % End point for x1
 cbnd = final(x2 == 2);         % End point for x2
 pathc = collocate(x3 >= 0.5);  % Path constraint for x3
 intc  = {integrate(x2) == 1};  % Integral constraint for x2
 cbnd = final(x3 >= 0.5);       % Final event constraint for x3
 cbnd = initial(x1 <= 2.0);     % Initial event constraint x1

== Single-phase optimal control example ==
Van der Pol Oscillator

Minimize:

$$\begin{matrix}
J_{x,t} & = & x_3(t_f) \\
\end{matrix}$$

Subject to:

$$\begin{cases}
\frac{dx_1}{dt} = (1-x_2^2)*x_1-x_2+u \\
\frac{dx_2}{dt} = x_1 \\
\frac{dx_3}{dt} = x_1^2+x_2^2+u^2 \\
x(t_0) = [0 \ 1 \ 0] \\
t_f = 5 \\
-0.3 \le u \le 1.0 \\
\end{cases}$$

To solve the problem with PROPT the following code can be used (with 60 collocation points):

toms t
p = tomPhase('p', t, 0, 5, 60);
setPhase(p);

tomStates x1 x2 x3
tomControls u

% Initial guess
x0 = {icollocate({x1 == 0; x2 == 1; x3 == 0})
    collocate(u == -0.01)};

% Box constraints
cbox = {-10  <= icollocate(x1) <= 10
    -10  <= icollocate(x2) <= 10
    -10  <= icollocate(x3) <= 10
    -0.3 <= collocate(u)   <= 1};

% Boundary constraints
cbnd = initial({x1 == 0; x2 == 1; x3 == 0});

% ODEs and path constraints
ceq = collocate({dot(x1) == (1-x2.^2).*x1-x2+u
    dot(x2) == x1; dot(x3) == x1.^2+x2.^2+u.^2});

% Objective
objective = final(x3);

% Solve the problem
options = struct;
options.name = 'Van Der Pol';
solution = ezsolve(objective, {cbox, cbnd, ceq}, x0, options);

== Multi-phase optimal control example ==
One-dimensional rocket with free end time and undetermined phase shift

Minimize:

$$\begin{matrix}
J_{x,t} & = & tCut \\
\end{matrix}$$

Subject to:

$$\begin{cases}
\frac{dx_1}{dt} = x_2 \\
\frac{dx_2}{dt} = a-g \ (0 < t <= tCut) \\
\frac{dx_2}{dt} = -g \ (tCut < t < t_f) \\
x(t_0) = [0 \ 0] \\
g = 1 \\
a = 2 \\
x_1(t_f) = 100 \\
\end{cases}$$

The problem is solved with PROPT by creating two phases and connecting them:

toms t
toms tCut tp2
p1 = tomPhase('p1', t, 0, tCut, 20);
p2 = tomPhase('p2', t, tCut, tp2, 20);

tf = tCut+tp2;

x1p1 = tomState(p1,'x1p1');
x2p1 = tomState(p1,'x2p1');
x1p2 = tomState(p2,'x1p2');
x2p2 = tomState(p2,'x2p2');

% Initial guess
x0 = {tCut==10
    tf==15
    icollocate(p1,{x1p1 == 50*tCut/10;x2p1 == 0;})
    icollocate(p2,{x1p2 == 50+50*t/100;x2p2 == 0;})};

% Box constraints
cbox = {
    1  <= tCut <= tf-0.00001
    tf <= 100
    0  <= icollocate(p1,x1p1)
    0  <= icollocate(p1,x2p1)
    0  <= icollocate(p2,x1p2)
    0  <= icollocate(p2,x2p2)};

% Boundary constraints
cbnd = {initial(p1,{x1p1 == 0;x2p1 == 0;})
    final(p2,x1p2 == 100)};

% ODEs and path constraints
a = 2; g = 1;
ceq = {collocate(p1,{
    dot(p1,x1p1) == x2p1
    dot(p1,x2p1) == a-g})
    collocate(p2,{
    dot(p2,x1p2) == x2p2
    dot(p2,x2p2) == -g})};

% Objective
objective = tCut;

% Link phase
link = {final(p1,x1p1) == initial(p2,x1p2)
    final(p1,x2p1) == initial(p2,x2p2)};

%% Solve the problem
options = struct;
options.name = 'One Dim Rocket';
constr = {cbox, cbnd, ceq, link};
solution = ezsolve(objective, constr, x0, options);

== Parameter estimation example ==
Parameter estimation problem

Minimize:

$$\begin{matrix}
J_{p} & = & \sum_{i=1,2,3,5}{(x_1(t_i) - x_1^m(t_i))^2} \\
\end{matrix}$$

Subject to:

$$\begin{cases}
\frac{dx_1}{dt} = x_2 \\
\frac{dx_2}{dt} = 1-2*x_2-x_1 \\
x_0 = [p_1 \ p_2] \\
t_i = [1 \ 2 \ 3 \ 5] \\
x_1^m(t_i) = [0.264 \ 0.594 \ 0.801 \ 0.959] \\
|p_{1:2}| <= 1.5 \\
\end{cases}$$

In the code below the problem is solved with a fine grid (10 collocation points). This solution is subsequently fine-tuned using 40 collocation points:

toms t p1 p2
x1meas = [0.264;0.594;0.801;0.959];
tmeas  = [1;2;3;5];

% Box constraints
cbox = {-1.5 <= p1 <= 1.5
    -1.5 <= p2 <= 1.5};

%% Solve the problem, using a successively larger number collocation points
for n=[10 40]
    p = tomPhase('p', t, 0, 6, n);
    setPhase(p);
    tomStates x1 x2

    % Initial guess
    if n == 10
        x0 = {p1 == 0; p2 == 0};
    else
        x0 = {p1 == p1opt; p2 == p2opt
            icollocate({x1 == x1opt; x2 == x2opt})};
    end

    % Boundary constraints
    cbnd = initial({x1 == p1; x2 == p2});

    % ODEs and path constraints
    x1err = sum((atPoints(tmeas,x1) - x1meas).^2);
    ceq = collocate({dot(x1) == x2; dot(x2) == 1-2*x2-x1});

    % Objective
    objective = x1err;

    %% Solve the problem
    options = struct;
    options.name   = 'Parameter Estimation';
    options.solver = 'snopt';
    solution = ezsolve(objective, {cbox, cbnd, ceq}, x0, options);

    % Optimal x, p for starting point
    x1opt = subs(x1, solution);
    x2opt = subs(x2, solution);
    p1opt = subs(p1, solution);
    p2opt = subs(p2, solution);
end

== Optimal control problems supported ==
- Aerodynamic trajectory control
- Bang-bang control
- Chemical engineering
- Dynamic systems
- General optimal control
- Large-scale linear control
- Multi-phase system control
- Mechanical engineering design
- Nondifferentiable control
- Parameters estimation for dynamic systems
- Singular control
