= Flat pseudospectral method =

Optimal control technique

The flat pseudospectral method is part of the family of the Ross–Fahroo pseudospectral methods introduced by Ross and Fahroo. The method combines the concept of differential flatness with pseudospectral optimal control to generate outputs in the so-called flat space.

== Concept ==
Because the differentiation matrix, $D$, in a pseudospectral method is square, higher-order derivatives of any polynomial, $y$, can be obtained by powers of $D$,

$$\begin{align}
\dot y &= D Y \\
\ddot y & = D^2 Y \\
&{} \  \vdots \\
y^{(\beta)} &= D^\beta Y
\end{align}$$

where $Y$ is the pseudospectral variable and $\beta$ is a finite positive integer. By differential flatness, there exists functions $a$ and $b$ such that the state and control variables can be written as,

$$\begin{align}
x & = a(y, \dot y, \ldots, y^{(\beta)}) \\
u & = b(y, \dot y, \ldots, y^{(\beta + 1)})
\end{align}$$

The combination of these concepts generates the flat pseudospectral method; that is, x and u are written as,

$$x = a(Y, D Y, \ldots, D^\beta Y)$$
$$u = b(Y, D Y, \ldots, D^{\beta + 1}Y)$$

Thus, an optimal control problem can be quickly and easily transformed to a problem with just the Y pseudospectral variable.

== See also ==
- Ross' π lemma
- Ross–Fahroo lemma
- Bellman pseudospectral method
