= Pseudospectral optimal control =

Numerical method for solving optimal control problems

Pseudospectral optimal control is a numerical technique for solving optimal control problems. These problems involve finding the best way to control a dynamic system, for example, calculating the most fuel-efficient trajectory for a spacecraft or determining the fastest way for a robot arm to move. The pseudospectral method transforms the original, continuous problem—which is often too complex to be solved directly—into a simpler set of algebraic equations that can be solved efficiently by a computer.

The method combines pseudospectral (PS) theory with optimal control theory and is notable for its high accuracy with a relatively small number of calculations. It has been used to solve a wide range of problems in military and industrial applications, such as those arising in UAV trajectory generation, missile guidance, control of robotic arms, vibration damping, and lunar guidance.

== Overview ==
There are a very large number of ideas that fall under the general banner of pseudospectral optimal control. Examples of these are the Legendre pseudospectral method, the Chebyshev pseudospectral method, the Gauss pseudospectral method, the Ross-Fahroo pseudospectral method, the Bellman pseudospectral method, the flat pseudospectral method and many others. Solving an optimal control problem requires the approximation of three types of mathematical objects: the integration in the cost function, the differential equation of the control system, and the state-control constraints. An ideal approximation method should be efficient for all three approximation tasks. A method that is efficient for one of them, for instance an efficient ODE solver, may not be an efficient method for the other two objects. These requirements make PS methods ideal because they are efficient for the approximation of all three mathematical objects. In a pseudospectral method, the continuous functions are approximated at a set of carefully selected quadrature nodes. The quadrature nodes are determined by the corresponding orthogonal polynomial basis used for the approximation. In PS optimal control, Legendre and Chebyshev polynomials are commonly used. Mathematically, quadrature nodes are able to achieve high accuracy with a small number of points. For instance, the interpolating polynomial of any smooth function (C^{$\infty$}) at Legendre–Gauss–Lobatto nodes converges in L^{2} sense at the so-called spectral rate, faster than any polynomial rate.

== Details ==
A basic pseudospectral method for optimal control is based on the covector mapping principle. Other pseudospectral optimal control techniques, such as the Bellman pseudospectral method, rely on node-clustering at the initial time to produce optimal controls. The node clusterings occur at all Gaussian points.

Moreover, their structure can be highly exploited to make them more computationally efficient, as ad-hoc scaling and Jacobian computation methods, involving dual number theory have been developed.

In pseudospectral methods, integration is approximated by quadrature rules, which provide the best numerical integration result. For example, with just N nodes, a Legendre-Gauss quadrature integration achieves zero error for any polynomial integrand of degree less than or equal to $2N-1$. In the PS discretization of the ODE involved in optimal control problems, a simple but highly accurate differentiation matrix is used for the derivatives. Because a PS method enforces the system at the selected nodes, the state-control constraints can be discretized straightforwardly. All these mathematical advantages make pseudospectral methods a straightforward discretization tool for continuous optimal control problems.

== See also ==
- Bellman pseudospectral method
- Chebyshev pseudospectral method
- Covector mapping principle
- Flat pseudospectral methods
- Gauss pseudospectral method
- Legendre pseudospectral method
- Pseudospectral knotting method
- Ross–Fahroo lemma
- Ross–Fahroo pseudospectral methods
- Ross' π lemma

== Software ==
- DIDO – MATLAB tool for optimal control named after Dido, the first queen of Carthage.
- GPOPS-II: General Purpose Optimal Control Software
- GESOP – Graphical Environment for Simulation and OPtimization
- OpenOCL – Open Optimal Control Library
- PROPT – MATLAB Optimal Control Software
- PSOPT – Open Source Pseudospectral Optimal Control Solver in C++
- SPARTAN: Simple Pseudospectral Algorithm for Rapid Trajectory ANalysis
- OpenGoddard – Python Open Source Pseudospectral Optimal Control Software
