= Differential dynamic programming =

Algorithm for trajectory optimization

Differential dynamic programming (DDP) is an optimal control algorithm of the trajectory optimization class. The algorithm was introduced in 1966 by Mayne and subsequently analysed in Jacobson and Mayne's eponymous book. The algorithm uses locally-quadratic models of the dynamics and cost functions, and displays quadratic convergence. It is closely related to Pantoja's step-wise Newton's method.

== Finite-horizon discrete-time problems ==
The dynamics

$\mathbf{x}_{i+1} = \mathbf{f}(\mathbf{x}_i,\mathbf{u}_i)$	1

describe the evolution of the state $\textstyle\mathbf{x}$ given the control $\mathbf{u}$ from time $i$ to time $i+1$. The total cost $J_0$ is the sum of running costs $\textstyle\ell$ and final cost $\ell_f$, incurred when starting from state $\mathbf{x}$ and applying the control sequence $\mathbf{U} \equiv \{\mathbf{u}_0,\mathbf{u}_1\dots,\mathbf{u}_{N-1}\}$ until the horizon is reached:

$$J_0(\mathbf{x},\mathbf{U})=\sum_{i=0}^{N-1}\ell(\mathbf{x}_i,\mathbf{u}_i) + \ell_f(\mathbf{x}_N),$$

where $\mathbf{x}_0\equiv\mathbf{x}$, and the $\mathbf{x}_i$ for $i>0$ are given by Eq. 1. The solution of the optimal control problem is the minimizing control sequence $\mathbf{U}^*(\mathbf{x})\equiv \operatorname{argmin}_{\mathbf{U}} J_0(\mathbf{x},\mathbf{U}).$ Trajectory optimization means finding $\mathbf{U}^*(\mathbf{x})$ for a particular $\mathbf{x}_0$, rather than for all possible initial states.

== Dynamic programming ==
Let $\mathbf{U}_i$ be the partial control sequence $\mathbf{U}_i \equiv \{\mathbf{u}_i,\mathbf{u}_{i+1}\dots,\mathbf{u}_{N-1}\}$ and define the cost-to-go $J_i$ as the partial sum of costs from $i$ to $N$:

$$J_i(\mathbf{x},\mathbf{U}_i)=\sum_{j=i}^{N-1}\ell(\mathbf{x}_j,\mathbf{u}_j) + \ell_f(\mathbf{x}_N).$$

The optimal cost-to-go or value function at time $i$ is the cost-to-go given the minimizing control sequence:

$$V(\mathbf{x},i)\equiv \min_{\mathbf{U}_i}J_i(\mathbf{x},\mathbf{U}_i).$$

Setting $V(\mathbf{x},N)\equiv \ell_f(\mathbf{x}_N)$, the dynamic programming principle reduces the minimization over an entire sequence of controls to a sequence of minimizations over a single control, proceeding backwards in time:

$V(\mathbf{x},i)= \min_{\mathbf{u}}[\ell(\mathbf{x},\mathbf{u}) + V(\mathbf{f}(\mathbf{x},\mathbf{u}),i+1)].$	2

This is the Bellman equation.

== Differential dynamic programming ==
DDP proceeds by iteratively performing a backward pass on the nominal trajectory to generate a new control sequence, and then a forward-pass to compute and evaluate a new nominal trajectory. We begin with the backward pass. If

$$\ell(\mathbf{x},\mathbf{u}) + V(\mathbf{f}(\mathbf{x},\mathbf{u}),i+1)$$

is the argument of the $\min[\cdot]$ operator in Eq. 2, let $Q$ be the variation of this quantity around the $i$-th $(\mathbf{x},\mathbf{u})$ pair:

$$\begin{align}Q(\delta\mathbf{x},\delta\mathbf{u})\equiv &\ell(\mathbf{x}+\delta\mathbf{x},\mathbf{u}+\delta\mathbf{u})&&{}+V(\mathbf{f}(\mathbf{x}+\delta\mathbf{x},\mathbf{u}+\delta\mathbf{u}),i+1)
\\
-&\ell(\mathbf{x},\mathbf{u})&&{}-V(\mathbf{f}(\mathbf{x},\mathbf{u}),i+1)
\end{align}$$

and expand to second order

$$\approx\frac{1}{2} \begin{bmatrix} 1\\ \delta\mathbf{x}\\ \delta\mathbf{u} \end{bmatrix}^\mathsf{T} \begin{bmatrix} 0 & Q_\mathbf{x}^\mathsf{T} & Q_\mathbf{u}^\mathsf{T}\\ Q_\mathbf{x} & Q_{\mathbf{x}\mathbf{x}} & Q_{\mathbf{x}\mathbf{u}}\\ Q_\mathbf{u} & Q_{\mathbf{u}\mathbf{x}} & Q_{\mathbf{u}\mathbf{u}} \end{bmatrix} \begin{bmatrix} 1\\ \delta\mathbf{x}\\ \delta\mathbf{u} \end{bmatrix}$$	3

The $Q$ notation used here is a variant of the notation of Morimoto where subscripts denote differentiation in denominator layout. Dropping the index $i$ for readability, primes denoting the next time-step $V'\equiv V(i+1)$, the expansion coefficients are

$$\begin{alignat}{2}
Q_\mathbf{x} &= \ell_\mathbf{x}+ \mathbf{f}_\mathbf{x}^\mathsf{T} V'_\mathbf{x} \\
Q_\mathbf{u} &= \ell_\mathbf{u}+ \mathbf{f}_\mathbf{u}^\mathsf{T} V'_\mathbf{x} \\
Q_{\mathbf{x}\mathbf{x}} &= \ell_{\mathbf{x}\mathbf{x}} + \mathbf{f}_\mathbf{x}^\mathsf{T} V'_{\mathbf{x}\mathbf{x}}\mathbf{f}_\mathbf{x}+V_\mathbf{x}'\cdot\mathbf{f}_{\mathbf{x}\mathbf{x}}\\
Q_{\mathbf{u}\mathbf{u}} &= \ell_{\mathbf{u}\mathbf{u}} + \mathbf{f}_\mathbf{u}^\mathsf{T} V'_{\mathbf{x}\mathbf{x}}\mathbf{f}_\mathbf{u}+{V'_\mathbf{x}} \cdot\mathbf{f}_{\mathbf{u} \mathbf{u}}\\
Q_{\mathbf{u}\mathbf{x}} &= \ell_{\mathbf{u}\mathbf{x}} + \mathbf{f}_\mathbf{u}^\mathsf{T} V'_{\mathbf{x}\mathbf{x}}\mathbf{f}_\mathbf{x} + {V'_\mathbf{x}} \cdot \mathbf{f}_{\mathbf{u} \mathbf{x}}.
\end{alignat}$$

The last terms in the last three equations denote contraction of a vector with a tensor. Minimizing the quadratic approximation (3) with respect to $\delta\mathbf{u}$ we have

${\delta \mathbf{u}}^* = \operatorname{argmin}\limits_{\delta \mathbf{u}}Q(\delta \mathbf{x},\delta \mathbf{u})=-Q_{\mathbf{u}\mathbf{u}}^{-1}(Q_\mathbf{u}+Q_{\mathbf{u}\mathbf{x}}\delta \mathbf{x}),$	4

giving an open-loop term $\mathbf{k}=-Q_{\mathbf{u}\mathbf{u}}^{-1}Q_\mathbf{u}$ and a feedback gain term $\mathbf{K}=-Q_{\mathbf{u}\mathbf{u}}^{-1}Q_{\mathbf{u}\mathbf{x}}$. Plugging the result back into (3), we now have a quadratic model of the value at time $i$:

$$\begin{alignat}{2}
\Delta V(i) &= &{} -\tfrac{1}{2}Q^T_\mathbf{u} Q_{\mathbf{u}\mathbf{u}}^{-1}Q_\mathbf{u}\\
V_\mathbf{x}(i) &= Q_\mathbf{x} & {}- Q_\mathbf{xu} Q_{\mathbf{u}\mathbf{u}}^{-1}Q_{\mathbf{u}}\\
V_{\mathbf{x}\mathbf{x}}(i) &= Q_{\mathbf{x}\mathbf{x}} &{} - Q_{\mathbf{x}\mathbf{u}}Q_{\mathbf{u}\mathbf{u}}^{-1}Q_{\mathbf{u}\mathbf{x}}.
\end{alignat}$$

Recursively computing the local quadratic models of $V(i)$ and the control modifications $\{\mathbf{k}(i),\mathbf{K}(i)\}$, from $i=N-1$ down to $i=1$, constitutes the backward pass. As above, the Value is initialized with $V(\mathbf{x},N)\equiv \ell_f(\mathbf{x}_N)$. Once the backward pass is completed, a forward pass computes a new trajectory:

$$\begin{align}
\hat{\mathbf{x}}(1)&=\mathbf{x}(1)\\
\hat{\mathbf{u}}(i)&=\mathbf{u}(i) + \mathbf{k}(i) +\mathbf{K}(i)(\hat{\mathbf{x}}(i) - \mathbf{x}(i))\\
\hat{\mathbf{x}}(i+1)&=\mathbf{f}(\hat{\mathbf{x}}(i),\hat{\mathbf{u}}(i))
\end{align}$$

The backward passes and forward passes are iterated until convergence. If the Hessians $Q_{\mathbf{x}\mathbf{x}}, Q_{\mathbf{u}\mathbf{u}}, Q_{\mathbf{u}\mathbf{x}}, Q_{\mathbf{x}\mathbf{u}}$ are replaced by their Gauss-Newton approximation, the method reduces to the iterative Linear Quadratic Regulator (iLQR).

== Regularization and line-search ==
Differential dynamic programming is a second-order algorithm like Newton's method. It therefore takes large steps toward the minimum and often requires regularization and/or line-search to achieve convergence. Regularization in the DDP context means ensuring that the $Q_{\mathbf{u}\mathbf{u}}$ matrix in Eq. 4 is positive definite. Line-search in DDP amounts to scaling the open-loop control modification $\mathbf{k}$ by some $0<\alpha<1$.

== Monte Carlo version ==
Sampled differential dynamic programming (SaDDP) is a Monte Carlo variant of differential dynamic programming. It is based on treating the quadratic cost of differential dynamic programming as the energy of a Boltzmann distribution. This way the quantities of DDP can be matched to the statistics of a multidimensional normal distribution. The statistics can be recomputed from sampled trajectories without differentiation.

Sampled differential dynamic programming has been extended to Path Integral Policy Improvement with Differential Dynamic Programming. This creates a link between differential dynamic programming and path integral control, which is a framework of stochastic optimal control.

== Constrained problems ==
Interior Point Differential dynamic programming (IPDDP) is an interior-point method generalization of DDP that can address the optimal control problem with nonlinear state and input constraints.

== See also ==
- Optimal control
