= ZPM =

ZPM may refer to:

- Mixtepec Zapotec (ISO 639-3 code: zpm), an Oto-Manguean language of Oaxaca, Mexico
- Zero-propellant maneuver, an optimal attitude trajectory used to perform spacecraft rotational control without the need to use thrusters
- Zero Point Module, a fictional device in the Stargate universe
- Zoram People's Movement, political party in Mizoram, India
- Zyvex Technologies (previously Zyvex Performance Materials), a molecular engineering company headquartered in Columbus, Ohio
