= I. Michael Ross =

Isaac Michael Ross is a Distinguished Professor and Program Director of Control and Optimization at the Naval Postgraduate School in Monterey, CA. He has published a highly-regarded textbook on optimal control theory and seminal papers in pseudospectral optimal control theory, energy-sink theory, the optimization and deflection of near-Earth asteroids and comets, robotics, attitude dynamics and control, orbital mechanics, real-time optimal control, unscented optimal control, continuous optimization and aeromaneuvering guidance and control. The Kang–Ross–Gong theorem, Ross' π lemma, Ross' time constant, the Ross–Fahroo lemma, and the Ross–Fahroo pseudospectral method are all named after him. According to a report published by Stanford University, Ross is one of the world's top 2% of scientists.

== Theoretical contributions ==
Although Ross has made contributions to energy-sink theory, attitude dynamics and control and planetary defense, he is best known for work on pseudospectral optimal control. In 2001, Ross and Fahroo announced the covector mapping principle, first, as a special result in pseudospectral optimal control, and later as a general result in optimal control. This principle was based on the Ross–Fahroo lemma which proves that dualization and discretization are not necessarily commutative operations and that certain steps must be taken to promote commutation. When discretization is commutative with dualization, then, under appropriate conditions, Pontryagin's minimum principle emerges as a consequence of the convergence of the discretization. Together with F. Fahroo, W. Kang and Q. Gong, Ross proved a series of results on the convergence of pseudospectral discretizations of optimal control problems. Ross and his coworkers showed that the Legendre and Chebyshev pseudospectral discretizations converge to an optimal solution of a problem under the mild condition of boundedness of variations.

== Software contributions ==
In 2001, Ross created DIDO, a software package for solving optimal control problems. Powered by pseudospectral methods, Ross created a user-friendly set of objects that required no knowledge of his theory to run DIDO. This work was used in on pseudospectral methods for solving optimal control problems. DIDO is used for solving optimal control problems in aerospace applications, search theory, and robotics. Ross' constructs have been licensed to other software products, and have been used by NASA to solve flight-critical problems on the International Space Station.

== Flight contributions ==
In 2006, NASA used DIDO to implement zero propellant maneuvering of the International Space Station. In 2007, SIAM News printed a page 1 article announcing the use of Ross' theory. This led other researchers to explore the mathematics of pseudospectral optimal control theory. DIDO is also used to maneuver the Space Station and operate various ground and flight equipment to incorporate autonomy and performance efficiency for nonlinear control systems.

== Awards and distinctions ==
In 2010, Ross was elected a Fellow of the American Astronautical Society for "his pioneering contributions to the theory, software and flight demonstration of pseudospectral optimal control." He also received (jointly with Fariba Fahroo), the AIAA Mechanics and Control of Flight Award for "fundamentally changing the landscape of flight mechanics". His research has made headlines in SIAM News, IEEE Control Systems Magazine, IEEE Spectrum, and Space Daily.

== See also ==
- Ross' π lemma
- Caratheodory-π solution
- Ross–Fahroo pseudospectral methods
- Ross–Fahroo lemma
- Covector mapping principle
- Bellman pseudospectral method
- Flat pseudospectral methods
- DIDO (optimal control)
