= Desaturation =

Desaturation may refer to:

- In pulse oximetry, the condition of a low blood oxygen concentration
- Reduction of colorfulness in image processing
- Conversion of a saturated compound into an unsaturated compound by a removal of two hydrogen molecules and the creation of a double bond
- Removal of excess angular momentum in a control moment gyroscope
