= Legendre–Clebsch condition =

In the calculus of variations the Legendre–Clebsch condition is a second-order condition which a solution of the Euler–Lagrange equation must satisfy in order to be a minimum.

For the problem of minimizing

$$\int_{a}^{b}  L(t,x,x')\, dt . \,$$

the condition is

$$L_{x' x'}(t,x(t),x'(t)) \ge 0, \, \forall t \in[a,b]$$

== Generalized Legendre–Clebsch ==
In optimal control, the situation is more complicated because of the possibility of a singular solution. The generalized Legendre–Clebsch condition, also known as convexity, is a sufficient condition for local optimality such that when the linear sensitivity of the Hamiltonian to changes in u is zero, i.e.,

$$\frac{\partial H}{\partial u} = 0,$$

the Hessian of the Hamiltonian is positive definite along the trajectory of the solution:

$$\frac{\partial^2 H}{\partial u^2} > 0$$

In words, the generalized LC condition gives ones more necessary condition for the Hamiltonian be minimized over a singular arc.

== See also ==
- Bang–bang control
