= Bellman pseudospectral method =

The Bellman pseudospectral method is a pseudospectral method for optimal control based on Bellman's principle of optimality. It is part of the larger theory of pseudospectral optimal control, a term coined by Ross. The method is named after Richard E. Bellman. It was introduced by Ross et al. first as a means to solve multiscale optimal control problems, and later expanded to obtain suboptimal solutions for general optimal control problems.

== Theoretical foundations ==
The multiscale version of the Bellman pseudospectral method is based on the spectral convergence property of the Ross–Fahroo pseudospectral methods. That is, because the Ross–Fahroo pseudospectral method converges at an exponentially fast rate, pointwise convergence to a solution is obtained at very low number of nodes even when the solution has high-frequency components. This aliasing phenomenon in optimal control was first discovered by Ross et al. Rather than use signal processing techniques to anti-alias the solution, Ross et al. proposed that Bellman's principle of optimality can be applied to the converged solution to extract information between the nodes. Because the Gauss–Lobatto nodes cluster at the boundary points, Ross et al. suggested that if the node density around the initial conditions satisfy the Nyquist–Shannon sampling theorem, then the complete solution can be recovered by solving the optimal control problem in a recursive fashion over piecewise segments known as Bellman segments.

In an expanded version of the method, Ross et al., proposed that method could also be used to generate feasible solutions that were not necessarily optimal. In this version, one can apply the Bellman pseudospectral method at even lower number of nodes even under the knowledge that the solution may not have converged to the optimal one. In this situation, one obtains a feasible solution.

A remarkable feature of the Bellman pseudospectral method is that it automatically determines several measures of suboptimality based on the original pseudospectral cost and the cost generated by the sum of the Bellman segments.

== Computational efficiency ==
One of the computational advantages of the Bellman pseudospectral method is that it allows one to escape Gaussian rules in the distribution of node points. That is, in a standard pseudospectral method, the distribution of node points are Gaussian (typically Gauss-Lobatto for finite horizon and Gauss-Radau for infinite horizon). The Gaussian points are sparse in the middle of the interval (middle is defined in a shifted sense for infinite-horizon problems) and dense at the boundaries. The second-order accumulation of points near the boundaries have the effect of wasting nodes. The Bellman pseudospectral method takes advantage of the node accumulation at the initial point to anti-alias the solution and discards the remainder of the nodes. Thus the final distribution of nodes is non-Gaussian and dense while the computational method retains a sparse structure.

== Applications ==
The Bellman pseudospectral method was first applied by Ross et al. to solve the challenging problem of very low thrust trajectory optimization. It has been successfully applied to solve a practical problem of generating very high accuracy solutions to a trans-Earth-injection problem of bringing a space capsule from a lunar orbit to a pin-pointed Earth-interface condition for successful reentry.

The Bellman pseudospectral method is most commonly used as an additional check on the optimality of a pseudospectral solution generated by the Ross–Fahroo pseudospectral methods. That is, in addition to the use of Pontryagin's minimum principle in conjunction with the solutions obtained by the Ross–Fahroo pseudospectral methods, the Bellman pseudospectral method is used as a primal-only test on the optimality of the computed solution.

== See also ==
- Legendre pseudospectral method
- Chebyshev pseudospectral method
- Pseudospectral knotting method
