= Gyroscopic control =

Gyroscopic control may refer to:

- Control moment gyroscope, an attitude control device generally used in spacecraft attitude control systems
- Gyroscopic control (gaming), accelerometers to as a control input
