= Singular control =

In optimal control, problems of singular control are problems that are difficult to solve because a straightforward application of Pontryagin's minimum principle fails to yield a complete solution. Only a few such problems have been solved, such as Merton's portfolio problem in financial economics or trajectory optimization in aeronautics. A more technical explanation follows.

The most common difficulty in applying Pontryagin's principle arises when the Hamiltonian depends linearly on the control $u$, i.e., is of the form: $H(u)=\phi(x,\lambda,t)u+\cdots$ and the control is restricted to being between an upper and a lower bound: $a\le u(t)\le b$. To minimize $H(u)$, we need to make $u$ as big or as small as possible, depending on the sign of $\phi(x,\lambda,t)$, specifically:

$$u(t) = \begin{cases} b, & \phi(x,\lambda,t)<0 \\ ?, & \phi(x,\lambda,t)=0 \\ a, & \phi(x,\lambda,t)>0.\end{cases}$$

If $\phi$ is positive at some times, negative at others and is only zero instantaneously, then the solution is straightforward and is a bang-bang control that switches from $b$ to $a$ at times when $\phi$ switches from negative to positive.

The case when $\phi$ remains at zero for a finite length of time $t_1\le t\le t_2$ is called the singular control case. Between $t_1$ and $t_2$ the maximization of the Hamiltonian with respect to $u$ gives us no useful information and the solution in that time interval is going to have to be found from other considerations. One approach is to repeatedly differentiate $\partial H/\partial u$ with respect to time until the control u again explicitly appears, though this is not guaranteed to happen eventually. One can then set that expression to zero and solve for u. This amounts to saying that between $t_1$ and $t_2$ the control $u$ is determined by the requirement that the singularity condition continues to hold. The resulting so-called singular arc, if it is optimal, will satisfy the Kelley condition:

$$(-1)^k \frac{\partial}{\partial u} \left[ {\left( \frac{d}{dt} \right)}^{2k} H_u  \right] \ge 0 ,\,  k=0,1,\cdots$$

Others refer to this condition as the generalized Legendre–Clebsch condition.

The term bang-singular control refers to a control that has a bang-bang portion as well as a singular portion.
