= Caratheodory-π solution =

A Carathéodory-π solution is a generalized solution to an ordinary differential equation. The concept is due to I. Michael Ross and named in honor of Constantin Carathéodory. Its practicality was demonstrated in 2008 by Ross et al. in a laboratory implementation of the concept. The concept is most useful for implementing feedback controls, particularly those generated by an application of Ross' pseudospectral optimal control theory.

== Mathematical background ==
A Carathéodory-π solution addresses the fundamental problem of defining a solution to a differential equation,

$$\dot x = g(x,t)$$

when g(x,t) is not differentiable with respect to x. Such problems arise quite naturally in defining the meaning of a solution to a controlled differential equation,

$$\dot x = f(x,u)$$

when the control, u, is given by a feedback law,

$$u = k(x,t)$$

where the function k(x,t) may be non-smooth with respect to x. Non-smooth feedback controls arise quite often in the study of optimal feedback controls and have been the subject of extensive study going back to the 1960s.

== Ross' concept ==
An ordinary differential equation,

$$\dot x = g(x,t)$$

is equivalent to a controlled differential equation,

$$\dot x = u$$

with feedback control, $u = g(x,t)$. Then, given an initial value problem, Ross partitions the time interval $[0, \infty)$ to a grid, $\pi = \{t_i\}_{i\ge 0}$ with $t_i \to \infty \text{ as } i \to \infty$. From $t_0$ to $t_1$, generate a control trajectory,

$$u(t) = g(x_0, t), \quad x(t_0) = x_0, \quad t_0 \le t \le t_1$$

to the controlled differential equation,

$$\dot x = u(t), \quad x(t_0) = x_0$$

A Carathéodory solution exists for the above equation because $t \mapsto u$ has discontinuities at most in t, the independent variable. At $t = t_1$, set $x_1 = x(t_1)$ and restart the system with $u(t) = g(x_1, t)$,

$$\dot x(t) = u(t), \quad x(t_1) = x_1, \quad t_1 \le t \le t_2$$

Continuing in this manner, the Carathéodory segments are stitched together to form a Carathéodory-π solution.

== Engineering applications ==
A Carathéodory-π solution can be applied towards the practical stabilization of a control system. It has been used to stabilize an inverted pendulum, control and optimize the motion of robots, slew and control the NPSAT1 spacecraft and produce guidance commands for low-thrust space missions.

== See also ==
- Ross' π lemma
