= Flatness (systems theory) =

Flatness in systems theory is a system property that extends the notion of controllability from linear systems to nonlinear dynamical systems. A system that has the flatness property is called a flat system. Flat systems have a (fictitious) flat output, which can be used to explicitly express all states and inputs in terms of the flat output and a finite number of its derivatives.

== Definition ==
A nonlinear system

$\dot{\mathbf{x}}(t) = \mathbf{f}(\mathbf{x}(t),\mathbf{u}(t)), \quad \mathbf{x}(0) = \mathbf{x}_0, \quad \mathbf{u}(t) \in R^m, \quad \mathbf{x}(t) \in R^n, \text{Rank} \frac{\partial\mathbf{f}(\mathbf{x},\mathbf{u})}{\partial\mathbf{u}} = m$

is flat, if there exists an output

$\mathbf{y}(t) = (y_1(t),...,y_m(t))$

that satisfies the following conditions:

- The signals $y_i,i=1,...,m$ are representable as functions of the states $x_i,i=1,...,n$ and inputs $u_i,i=1,...,m$ and a finite number of derivatives with respect to time $u_i^{(k)}, k=1,...,\alpha_i$: $\mathbf{y} = \Phi(\mathbf{x},\mathbf{u},\dot{\mathbf{u}},...,\mathbf{u}^{(\alpha)})$.
- The states $x_i,i=1,...,n$ and inputs $u_i,i=1,...,m$ are representable as functions of the outputs $y_i,i=1,...,m$ and of its derivatives with respect to time $y_i^{(k)}, i=1,...,m$.
- The components of $\mathbf{y}$ are differentially independent, that is, they satisfy no differential equation of the form $\phi(\mathbf{y},\dot{\mathbf{y}},...,\mathbf{y}^{(\gamma)}) = \mathbf{0}$, where $\phi$ is not the null function.

If these conditions are satisfied at least locally, then the (possibly fictitious) output is called flat output, and the system is flat.

== Relation to controllability of linear systems ==
A linear system $\dot{\mathbf{x}}(t) = \mathbf{A}\mathbf{x}(t) + \mathbf{B}\mathbf{u}(t), \quad \mathbf{x}(0) = \mathbf{x}_0$ with the same signal dimensions for $\mathbf{x},\mathbf{u}$ as the nonlinear system is flat, if and only if it is controllable, hence both flatness and controllability are interchangeable terms.

== Significance ==
The flatness property is useful for both the analysis of and controller synthesis for nonlinear dynamical systems. It is particularly advantageous for solving trajectory planning problems and asymptotical setpoint following control.

== Literature ==
- M. Fliess, J. L. Lévine, P. Martin and P. Rouchon: Flatness and defect of non-linear systems: introductory theory and examples. International Journal of Control 61(6), pp. 1327-1361, 1995
- A. Isidori, C.H. Moog et A. De Luca. A Sufficient Condition for Full Linearization via Dynamic State Feedback. 25th CDC IEEE, Athens, Greece, pp. 203 - 208, 1986

== See also ==
- Control theory
- Control engineering
- Controller (control theory)
- Flat pseudospectral method
