= Zero-propellant maneuver =

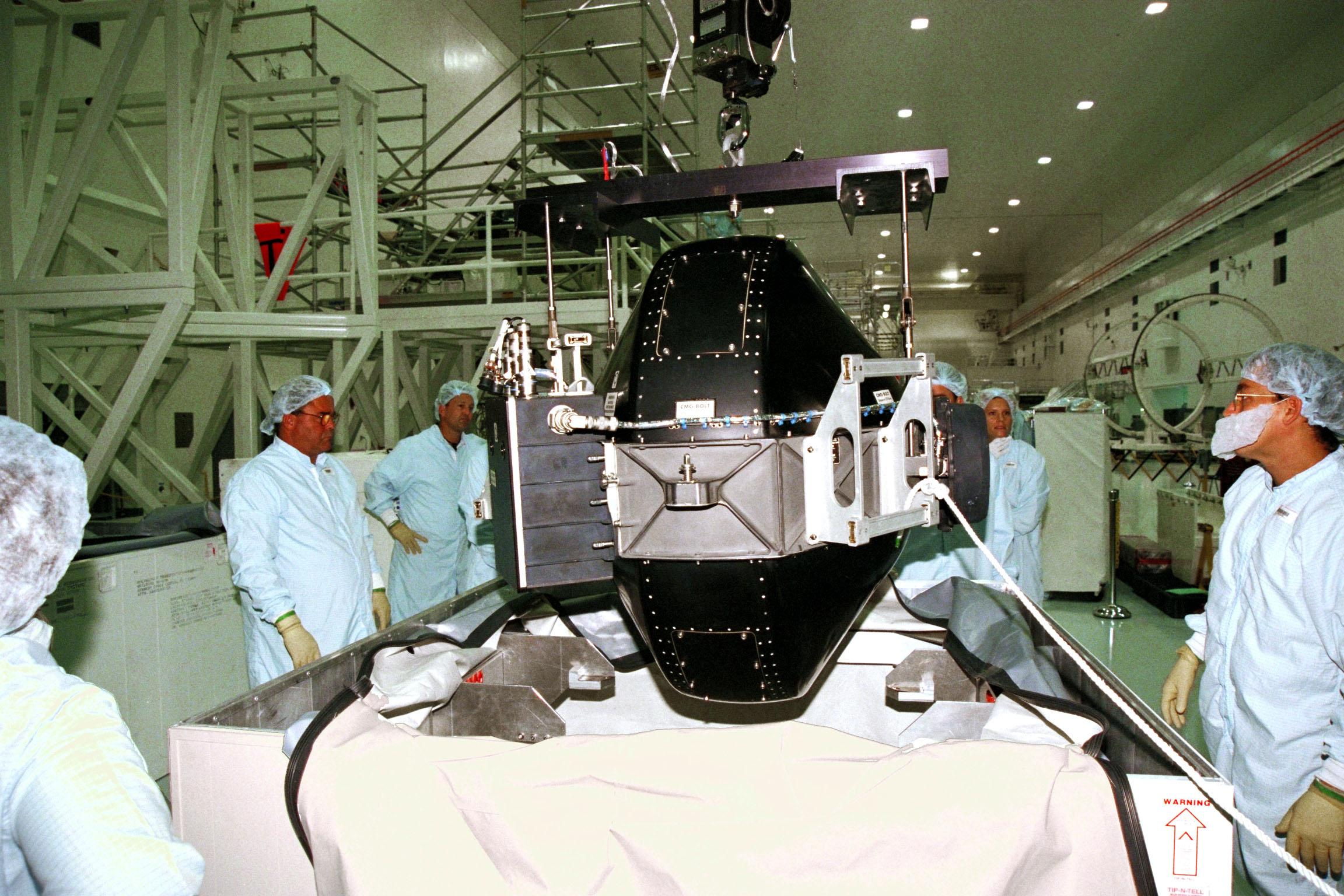
Zero-propellant maneuvers can be achieved by carefully planning and commanding operations with attitude control devices such as this Control Moment Gyroscope for the International Space Station

A zero-propellant maneuver (ZPM) is an optimal attitude trajectory used to perform spacecraft rotational control without the need to use thrusters. ZPMs are designed for spacecraft that use momentum storage actuators. Spacecraft ZPMs are used to perform large angle rotations or rate damping (detumbling) without saturating momentum actuators, and momentum dumping (from storage) without thrusters.

== Background ==
Spacecraft rotational operations, such as turning to point in a new direction, are usually performed by angular momentum storage devices such as reaction wheels or control moment gyroscopes. It is generally preferable to use these devices instead of traditional thrusters, as they are powered by renewable electricity instead of by propellant; firing thrusters uses up the fixed amount of propellant on the spacecraft. Propellant is very costly because it must be carried from earth; once it is used up, the spacecraft's life is over. Therefore, the operational life of the spacecraft is determined by the amount of propellant carried, and the rate at which the propellant is used up. Propellant is used for two main purposes: to maintain the spacecraft in orbit, and to control rotation. Therefore, the less propellant that has to be used for controlling rotation, the more that is available for maintaining orbit, and the longer the lifetime of the spacecraft.

However, momentum storage devices have a limited capacity, and that capacity soon becomes saturated when they are required to absorb spacecraft disturbance torques caused by (gravity gradient, solar wind, and aerodynamic drag); when in other words they reach their momentum storage limit. Once saturation is reached, momentum storage devices cannot apply torque to control the spacecraft's orientation. The spacecraft then typically requires thrusters using propellant to 'desaturate' the storage devices, in other words to unload the accumulated momentum, and so to restore the spacecraft's full ability to carry out rotational operations.

Spacecraft experience orbital decay due to drag. To maintain their orbit, thrusters are used to reboost the spacecraft to a higher altitude. Because on board propellant capacity is limited, the spacecraft can only perform a limited number of momentum desaturations or reboosts. Therefore, if momentum desaturations can be reduced or eliminated, a larger fraction of propellant can be used to maintain the spacecraft in its desired orbit, and it will have a longer operational lifetime.

Typically spacecraft rotations are performed as quaternion rotations or about a fixed axis (Euler's rotation theorem) usually referred to as an eigenaxis. Rotations about an eigenaxis result in the smallest angle between two orientations. Moreover, eigenaxis rotations are performed with a fixed rotation rate or maneuver rate. However, to maintain the spacecraft rotation about the eigenaxis, and at a fixed maneuver rate, requires the momentum storage actuators to overcome disturbance torques acting on the spacecraft. Depending on the intensity of the disturbances, the size of rotation and momentum storage device capacity, momentum storage devices can become saturated even if the spacecraft is rotated at a small maneuver rate.

Fortunately, however, the choice of rotation path impacts the spacecraft performance. This enables ZPMs to offer a new way to perform spacecraft rotations. Unlike eigenaxis smallest angle rotations, ZPMs are larger angle but minimum fuel rotations. Unlike eigenaxis fixed axis and maneuver rate rotations, ZPM rotations vary the rotation axis and maneuver rate during the maneuver. Just like eigenaxis rotations, ZPM rotations can be generated by commanding the spacecraft with a time varying attitude and rate command. However, ZPM rotations require significantly more time than eigenaxis rotations. ZPM trajectories can also be used to reduce propellant consumption even when the spacecraft uses thrusters instead of momentum storage devices. This application is referred to as a Reduced Propellant Maneuver (RPM) since even though propellant use is minimized some propellant will have to be used.

== Theory ==
A ZPM is a non-eigenaxis attitude trajectory that exploits the spacecraft environmental dynamics (e.g. gravity gradient, solar pressure, aerodynamics etc.) to eliminate the need for mass expulsion actuators during rotational operations.

ZPMs are developed by solving a specific nonlinear two-point-boundary-value optimal control problem for a fixed maneuver end time. Whereas an eigenaxis maneuver maintains a constant rotation axis and maneuver rate, a ZPM uses a time varying rotation axis and maneuver rate. An eigenaxis maneuver attitude trajectory tries to overcome disturbances to maintain a constant maneuver rate, which results in saturating the momentum storage devices. By using a variable maneuver rate, ZPMs avoid saturation of momentum storage actuators.

A simplified model for a spacecraft ZPM is a sailboat. A sailboat tacks against the wind to travel in a zig-zag manner without using its outboard motors thus not using any propellant. The sailboat takes advantage of the winds just like ZPM takes advantage of spacecraft environmental disturbances. The sailboat does not take the shortest path to travel from one location to the other. Similarly, a ZPM does not take the shortest angular path between two orientations. One can think of the sailboat rudder as the equivalent of the momentum storage actuators on a spacecraft.

== Applications ==
ZPMs were demonstrated on the International Space Station (ISS) in 2006 and 2007. On November 5, 2006, the ISS performed a 90 degree ZPM in 2 hours, while on March 3, 2007 the ISS performed a 180 degree ZPM in 2 hours and 47 minutes. The ZPM optimal control problems for both ISS maneuvers were solved using DIDO software.

== History ==
The optimal control problem used in the ISS ZPM was formulated and solved by Jesse Pietz in his Master's thesis, and the 90° ISS ZPM was developed by Sagar Bhatt for his Master's thesis.

== See also ==
- Attitude control
- Control moment gyroscope
- DIDO
- Legendre pseudospectral method
- Momentum wheel
- Reaction wheels
