= TOMLAB =

Mathematical optimization software

- Developer(s): Tomlab Optimization Inc.
- Stable release: 8.7 / 17 September 2020
- Written in: MATLAB, C, Fortran
- Operating system: Windows 32/64-bit, Linux 32/64-bit and Mac OS X (Intel)
- Size: 89 MB (Windows 32-bit)
- Type: Technical computing
- License: Proprietary
- Website: TOMLAB product page

The TOMLAB Optimization Environment is a modeling platform for solving applied optimization problems in MATLAB.

== Description ==
TOMLAB is a general purpose development and modeling environment in MATLAB for research, teaching and practical solution of optimization problems. It enables a wider range of problems to be solved in MATLAB and provides many additional solvers.

== Optimization problems supported ==
- TOMLAB handles a wide range of problem types, among them:
  - Linear programming
  - Quadratic programming
  - Nonlinear programming
  - Mixed-integer programming
  - Mixed-integer quadratic programming with or without convex quadratic constraints
  - Mixed-integer nonlinear programming
  - Linear and nonlinear least squares with L1, L2 and infinity norm
  - Exponential data fitting
  - Global optimization
  - Semi-definite programming problem with bilinear matrix inequalities
  - Constrained goal attainment
  - Geometric programming
  - Genetic programming
  - Costly or expensive black-box global optimization
  - Nonlinear complementarity problems

== Additional features ==
- TOMLAB supports more areas than general optimization, for example:
  - Optimal control with PROPT using Gauss and Chebyshev collocation.
  - Automatic differentiation with MAD
  - Interface to AMPL

== Further details ==
TOMLAB supports solvers like CPLEX, SNOPT, KNITRO and MIDACO. Each such solver can be called to solve one single model formulation. The supported solvers are appropriate for many problems, including linear programming, integer programming, and global optimization.

An interface to AMPL makes it possible to formulate the problem in an algebraic format. The MATLAB Compiler enables the user to build stand-alone solutions. Sister products are available for LabVIEW and Microsoft .NET.

Modeling is mainly facilitated by the TomSym class.
