= Anil V. Rao =

- Education: Princeton University (M.A. and Ph.D.), University of Michigan (M.S.E.), Cornell University (B.S. and A.B.)
- Scientific career
- Fields: Optimal control, guidance and control of aerospace vehicles
- Workplaces: University of Florida, Draper Laboratory, The Aerospace Corporation

Anil Vithala Rao is a professor in the Department of Mechanical and Aerospace Engineering at the University of Florida and specializes in computational methods for optimal control and guidance and control of aerospace vehicles. He is the co-creator of the optimal control software GPOPS-II and is the author of the textbook Dynamics of Particles and Rigid Bodies: A Systematic Approach.

== Education ==
Rao earned his Ph.D. in mechanical and aerospace engineering from Princeton University, his M.S.E. in aerospace engineering from the University of Michigan, and his B.S. in mechanical engineering and A.B. in mathematics from Cornell University.
