= Covector mapping principle =

Principle in control theory

The covector mapping principle is a special case of Riesz' representation theorem, which is a fundamental theorem in functional analysis. The name was coined by Ross and coauthors, It provides conditions under which dualization can be commuted with discretization in the case of computational optimal control.

== Description ==
An application of Pontryagin's minimum principle to Problem $B$, a given optimal control problem generates a boundary value problem. According to Ross, this boundary value problem is a Pontryagin lift and is represented as Problem $B^\lambda$.

Illustration of the Covector Mapping Principle (adapted from Ross and Fahroo.

Now suppose one discretizes Problem $B^\lambda$. This generates Problem$B^{\lambda N}$ where $N$ represents the number of discrete points. For convergence, it is necessary to prove that as

$$N \to \infty, \quad \text{Problem } B^{\lambda N} \to \text{Problem } B^\lambda$$

In the 1960s Kalman and others showed that solving Problem $B^{\lambda N}$ is extremely difficult. This difficulty, known as the curse of complexity, is complementary to the curse of dimensionality.

In a series of papers starting in the late 1990s, Ross and Fahroo showed that one could arrive at a solution to Problem $B^{\lambda}$ (and hence Problem $B$) more easily by discretizing first (Problem $B^{N}$) and dualizing afterwards (Problem $B^{N \lambda}$). The sequence of operations must be done carefully to ensure consistency and convergence. The covector mapping principle asserts that a covector mapping theorem can be discovered to map the solutions of Problem $B^{N \lambda}$ to Problem $B^{\lambda N}$ thus completing the circuit.

== See also ==
- Legendre pseudospectral method
- Ross–Fahroo pseudospectral methods
- Ross–Fahroo lemma
