= TomSym =

- Developer(s): Tomlab Optimization Inc.
- Stable release: 7.8 / December 16, 2011
- Operating system: TOMLAB - OS Support
- Type: Technical computing
- License: Proprietary
- Website: TomSym product page

The TomSym MATLAB symbolic modeling engine is a platform for modeling applied optimization and optimal control problems.

== Description ==
TomSym is complete modeling environment in Matlab with support for most built-in mathematical operators in Matlab. It is a combined modeling, compilation and interface to the TOMLAB solvers. The matrix derivative of a matrix function is a fourth rank tensor - that is, a matrix each of whose entries is a matrix. Rather than using four-dimensional matrices to represent this, TomSym continues to work in two dimensions. This makes it possible to take advantage of the very efficient handling of sparse matrices in Matlab, which is not available for higher-dimensional matrices.

TomSym has a variety of functions, among them:

- Ability to transform expressions and generate analytical first and second order derivatives, including sparsity patterns.
- Interfaced and compatible with MAD, i.e. MAD can be used when symbolic modeling is not suitable.
- Numerical differentiation can be used to parts of the model.
- Functionality for plotting and computing a variety of information for the solution to the problem.
- Support for if, then, else statements.
- Ability to analyze p-coded Matlab files.
- Automated code simplification for generated models, for example.
  - Multiplication by 1 or the identity matrix is eliminated: 1*A = A
  - Addition/subtraction of 0 is eliminated: 0+A = A
  - All-same matrices are reduced to scalars: [3;3;3]+x = 3+x
  - Scalars are moved to the left in addition/subtraction: A-y = -y+A
  - Inverse operations cancel: sqrt(x)^2 = x

== Modeling ==
The TomSym symbolic source transformation makes it possible to define any the set of decision variables (both continuous and integer) and any type of constraint as well as scalars and constant parameters.

=== Linear programming ===
An example linear programming problem would look like this:

 c = [-7; -5];
 A = [ 1 2
         4 1 ];
 b_U = [ 6; 12 ];
 x_L = [ 0; 0 ];

 toms 2x1 x

 solution = ezsolve(c'*x, {A*x<=b_U, x_L<=x});

=== Mixed-integer nonlinear programming ===
A MINLP problem is defined just like a linear programming problem. This example also shows how to convert the model into a general TOMLAB problem.

Name='minlp1Demo - Kocis/Grossman.';

toms 2x1 x
toms 3x1 integer y

objective = [2 3 1.5 2 -0.5]*[x;y];

constraints = { ...
    x(1) >= 0, ...
    x(2) >= 1e-8, ...
    x <= 1e8, ...
    0 <= y <=1, ...
    [1 0 1 0 0]*[x;y] <= 1.6, ...
    1.333*x(2) + y(2) <= 3, ...
    [-1 -1 1]*y <= 0, ...
    x(1)^2+y(1) == 1.25, ...
    sqrt(x(2)^3)+1.5*y(2) == 3, ...
};

guess = struct('x', ones(size(x)), 'y', ones(size(y)));
options = struct;
options.name = Name;
Prob = sym2prob('minlp', objective, constraints, guess, options);

Prob.DUNDEE.optPar(20) = 1;
Result = tomRun('minlpBB', Prob, 2);

=== Multi-index modeling ===
tomSym makes it possible to build models with two or more variable indices in MATLAB. The following example creates a variable 'flow' with four indices. The variable is then used to create a constraint over two of the indices and to sum the multiplication with a two-dimensional matrix.

% Create the indices used in model
i = tomArrayIdx('i', 1:6);
j = tomArrayIdx('j', 1:6);
k = tomArrayIdx('k', 1:6);
l = tomArrayIdx('l', 1:6);

% Create an integer variable of full length
flow = tom('flow', 6^4, 1, 'int');

% Convert the variable to a matrix with four indices.
flow = tomArray(flow,[6, 6, 6, 6]);

% Create a constraint valid for all i and j
cons = {sum(sum(flow(i, j, k, l), k), l) == 1};

% Create a scalar based on multi-index multiplications
distance = tomArray([   0   945   605   4667   4749    4394;...
    945     0   866   3726   3806    3448;...
    605   866     0   4471   4541    4152;...
    4667  3726  4471      0    109     415;...
    4749  3806  4541    109      0     431;...
    4394  3448  4152    415    431       0]);

sumtotal = sum(vec((distance(i, k) + distance(l, j)+...
    distance(k, l)*.8).*flow(i, j, k, l)));

=== Automatic and numerical differentiation ===
For functions that cannot be interpreted by tomSym it is possible to use either automatic differentiation or numerical differentiation. In the following example a simple problem is solved using the two methods.

toms x1 x2
alpha = 100;

% USE MAD (AUTOMATIC DIFFERENTIATION) FOR ONE FUNCTION
%
% Create a wrapper function. In this case we use sin, but it could be any
% MAD supported function.

y = wrap(struct('fun','sin','n',1,'sz1',1,'sz2',1,'JFuns','MAD'),x1/x2);
f = alpha*(x2-x1^2)^2 + (1-x1)^2 + y;

% Setup and solve the problem
c = -x1^2 - x2;
con = {-1000 <= c <= 0
    -10 <= x1 <= 2
    -10 <= x2 <= 2};

x0 = {x1 == -1.2
    x2 == 1};

solution1 = ezsolve(f, con, x0);

% USE NUMERICAL DIFFERENTIATION FOR ONE FUNCTIONS
% Create a new wrapper function. In this case we use sin, but it could be
% any function since we use numerical derivatives.

y = wrap(struct('fun', 'sin', 'n', 1, 'sz1', 1, 'sz2', 1, 'JFuns', 'FDJac'), x1/ x2);
f = alpha*(x2-x1^2)^2 + (1-x1)^2 + y;

solution2 = ezsolve(f,con,x0);
