= Fariba Fahroo =

American mathematician

Fariba Fahroo is an American Persian mathematician, a program manager at the Air Force Office of Scientific Research, and a former program manager at the Defense Sciences Office. Along with I. M. Ross, she has published papers in pseudospectral optimal control theory. (Note: F. Fahroo and I. M. Ross, “A Second Look at Approximating Differential Inclusions,” Journal of Guidance, Control, and Dynamics, Vol.24, No.1, January–February 2001.) (Note: F. Fahroo and I. M. Ross, “Costate Estimation by a Legendre Pseudospectral Method,” Journal of Guidance, Control, and Dynamics, Vol.24, No.2, March–April 2001, pp. 270–277) (Note: F. Fahroo and I. M. Ross, “Direct Trajectory Optimization by a Chebyshev Pseudospectral Method,” Journal of Guidance, Control, and Dynamics, Vol. 25, No. 1, 2002, pp. 160–166) (Note: F. Fahroo and I. M. Ross, “Pseudospectral Methods for Infinite-Horizon Optimal Control Problems,” Journal of Guidance, Control, and Dynamics, Vol. 31, No. 4, pp. 927–936, 2008.) (Note: F. Fahroo and I. M. Ross, “Convergence of the Costates Does Not Imply Convergence of the Control,” Journal of Guidance, Control, and Dynamics, Vol. 31, No. 5, pp. 1492–1497, 2008.) (Note: I. M. Ross and F. Fahroo, Legendre Pseudospectral Approximations of Optimal Control Problems, Lecture Notes in Control and Information Sciences, Vol. 295, Springer-Verlag, 2003.) (Note: I. M. Ross and F. Fahroo, Pseudospectral Knotting Methods for Solving Optimal Control Problems, Journal of Guidance, Control, and Dynamics, Vol. 27, No. 3, May–June 2004.) (Note: I. M. Ross and F. Fahroo, Discrete Verification of Necessary Conditions for Switched Nonlinear Optimal Control Systems, Proceedings of the American Control Conference, Invited Paper, June 2004, Boston, MA.) (Note: I. M. Ross and F. Fahroo, Pseudospectral Methods for the Optimal Motion Planning of Differentially Flat Systems, IEEE Transactions on Automatic Control, Vol.49, No.8, pp. 1410–1413, August 2004) The Ross–Fahroo lemma and the Ross–Fahroo pseudospectral method are named after her. In 2010, she received (jointly with Ross), the AIAA Mechanics and Control of Flight Award for fundamental contributions to flight mechanics.

In 2019, she was named a Fellow of the Society for Industrial and Applied Mathematics "for outstanding scientific leadership while managing AFOSR and DARPA programs in dynamics and control and computational mathematics and fundamental research accomplishments in computational optimal control". She was named to the 2021 class of Fellows of the American Association for the Advancement of Science.

== See also ==
- Ross–Fahroo pseudospectral methods
- Ross–Fahroo lemma
- Flat pseudospectral methods
