= Douglas Breeden =

American financial economist

Douglas T. Breeden
- Known for: State prices implicit in option prices Consumption CAPM

Academic background
- Education: Massachusetts Institute of Technology (S.B.); Stanford University (Ph.D.)

Academic work
- Discipline: Financial economics
- Institutions: Fuqua School of Business, Duke University
- Awards: Fellow of the American Finance Association (2010); IAQF Financial Engineer of the Year (2013)

Douglas T. Breeden is an American financial economist who is the William W. Priest Professor of Finance at the Fuqua School of Business at Duke University, where he served as dean from 2001 to 2007. He is known for his work with Robert Litzenberger showing how state prices can be derived from option prices, and for his development of the consumption-based capital asset pricing model (CCAPM). He co-founded the investment firm Smith Breeden Associates and was named a Fellow of the American Finance Association in 2010.

== Education ==
Breeden received an S.B. in management science from the Massachusetts Institute of Technology. He spent a year in the doctoral (D.B.A.) program at Harvard Business School before transferring to Stanford University, where he received a Ph.D. in finance.

== Academic career ==
Before joining Duke, Breeden taught at the University of Chicago, Stanford University, and the University of North Carolina at Chapel Hill, and was a visiting professor at the Yale School of Organization and Management. At North Carolina he held the Dalton McMichael Professorship of Finance. From 2011 to 2013 he was the Fischer Black Visiting Professor of Financial Economics at the MIT Sloan School of Management.

Breeden was the founding editor of the Journal of Fixed Income and served as its editor for ten years. He has also served as an associate editor of The Journal of Finance, The Review of Financial Studies, the Journal of Financial and Quantitative Analysis, the Journal of Financial Economics, and the Journal of Money, Credit and Banking. He has served on the MIT President's Council and the Stanford Graduate School of Business Advisory Council. He was elected to the board of directors of the American Finance Association.

=== Dean of the Fuqua School of Business ===
Breeden became dean of Fuqua in 2001 and was reappointed to a second five-year term in February 2005. He led the school through the economic downturn that followed the September 11 attacks, during which Fuqua reduced its budget. During his tenure, Fuqua's faculty grew to 98 members and enrollment rose to more than 800 students after the school added a sixth section to its daytime MBA program. The school also expanded its Ph.D. program, built international programs in Europe and Asia, and established research centers including the Center for the Advancement of Social Entrepreneurship and the Fuqua/Coach K Center of Leadership and Ethics. Duke provost Peter Lange credited Breeden with raising the quality of faculty hiring, financially restructuring the school, and strengthening its fundraising, and said the school's endowment had grown substantially under his leadership.

In March 2006, Duke announced that Breeden would step down as dean effective June 30, 2007, and return to teaching and research while keeping his professorship. Breeden said his main goal in the preceding year had been raising funds for a new classroom building and library. He was succeeded by Blair Sheppard.

== Research ==
In a 1978 paper with Robert Litzenberger in the Journal of Business, Breeden showed that the prices of state-contingent claims can be inferred from the prices of options at different strike prices. The result is widely used to estimate risk-neutral probability distributions from option prices.

In a 1979 paper in the Journal of Financial Economics, Breeden showed that the multiple-factor intertemporal asset pricing model of Robert C. Merton can be expressed in terms of a single factor: an asset's covariance with aggregate consumption. This result is the basis of the consumption-based capital asset pricing model. He has also published research on mortgage-backed securities and hedging.

In later work with Litzenberger, Breeden applied the 1978 method to interest rate caps and floors to study how central bank policies in the United States, the United Kingdom, and the Eurozone affected the distribution of state prices for future interest rates from 2003 to 2022. The research received a Roger F. Murray Prize from the Q Group. In 2024, he applied a similar approach to S&P 500 index options to study time variation in the equity risk premium.

== Consumption-based capital asset pricing model ==
Breeden's 1979 paper in the Journal of Financial Economics derived the consumption-based capital asset pricing model (CCAPM) within Robert C. Merton's 1973 intertemporal CAPM. Merton's model priced assets using multiple betas: one for the market and one for each variable describing shifting investment opportunities. Breeden showed that, under Merton's assumptions, these collapse into a single beta measured against aggregate consumption. The model built on earlier work by Mark Rubinstein (1976) and by Breeden and Robert Litzenberger (1978), and was developed alongside Robert Lucas Jr.'s 1978 model.

Eugene Fama described the consumption-based model of Rubinstein, Lucas and Breeden as "the most elegant of the available intertemporal asset pricing models". Merton called it "a particularly imaginative and fundamental contribution", noting that, unlike the classical CAPM, it does not imply that all investors hold perfectly correlated, mean-variance efficient portfolios. Sanford J. Grossman and Robert J. Shiller extended the result to economies with non-traded assets and heterogeneous information, writing that "Breeden's result is even more powerful than is suggested by his paper". Robert E. Hall described Breeden as "a pioneer in what has become known as the consumption capital asset pricing model".

The scientific background for the 2013 Nobel Memorial Prize in Economic Sciences, awarded to Fama, Lars Peter Hansen and Shiller, traces the origins of the CCAPM to Merton (1973), Lucas (1978) and Breeden (1979).

With Litzenberger and Tingyan Jia, Breeden reviewed the development and empirical testing of consumption-based asset pricing in a two-part survey in the Annual Review of Financial Economics.

== Invited lectures and editorial work ==
Breeden delivered a keynote address, "Stock and Bond Insurance Prices Implicit in Option Prices", at the 2020 annual meeting of the Midwest Finance Association. In 2014, he gave the keynote speech, "Extracting Information from Asset Prices and Consumption Growth", at the annual conference of the International Association for Quantitative Finance. In November 2023, he was among the lecturers at a conference at the Isenberg School of Management of the University of Massachusetts Amherst marking the 50th anniversary of the Black–Scholes–Merton option pricing model. With John Hull and Sanjay Nawalkha, he co-edited two special issues of the Journal of Investment Management based on the conference.

He has presented his research on central bank policy and interest rate state prices at the Federal Reserve Bank of New York, the Federal Reserve Bank of Minneapolis, the Bank of England, the Bank of Italy, and the Bank of France, and at a 2016 seminar hosted by HKU Business School at the University of Hong Kong.

== Business career ==
Breeden co-founded Smith Breeden Associates, a fixed-income asset management firm based in the Research Triangle area of North Carolina, and later served as its chairman emeritus. The firm was later acquired by the French asset manager Amundi and renamed Amundi Smith Breeden. In 2017, Amundi combined Amundi Smith Breeden with Pioneer Investments to form Amundi Pioneer Asset Management.

He served on the board of trustees of Commonfund, which manages investments for nonprofit institutions, from 2014 to 2023, and was chair of the board in 2022 and 2023.

== Awards and honors ==
- Fellow of the American Finance Association (2010)
- Financial Engineer of the Year (2013), International Association for Quantitative Finance and SunGard, presented by Robert C. Merton in February 2014
- Roger F. Murray Prize, Q Group
- Outstanding Teacher award, MIT Sloan School of Management (as Fischer Black Visiting Professor, 2011–2013)
- Honorary Professor, Graduate University of the Chinese Academy of Sciences (2006)
- Batterymarch Fellowship
- Harry M. Markowitz Special Distinction Award, Journal of Investment Management (2024), for "Stock Market Insurance Prices, BL Skew, Conditional Marginal Utilities and the Equity Risk Premium"

== Philanthropy ==
Breeden provided the naming gift for Breeden Hall, a building at the Fuqua School of Business. He and his wife also endowed the Douglas and Josie Breeden Distinguished Professorship of Financial Economics at Fuqua. According to his personal website, he also provided naming gifts for the Breeden Memorial Library in his hometown of Leavenworth, Indiana, and a theater at Episcopal High School.
