= Jack L. Treynor =

American economist (1930–2016)

Jack Lawrence Treynor (February 21, 1930 – May 11, 2016) was an American economist who served as the President of Treynor Capital Management in Palos Verdes Estates, California. He was a Senior Editor and Advisory Board member of the Journal of Investment Management, and was a Senior Fellow of the Institute for Quantitative Research in Finance. He served for many years as the editor of the CFA Institute's Financial Analysts Journal.

== Career ==
Treynor was the protégé of Franco Modigliani and mentor of Fischer Black. Trained as a mathematics major at Haverford College, he completed Harvard Business School with distinction in 1955 and stayed on for a year afterwards writing cases for Professor Robert Anthony. In 1956, he coauthored a paper on capital equipment leasing. At Harvard, Treynor had been taught that the way to make long-term plant decisions was to discount the 20, 30 or 40 year stream of future benefits back to the present and compare its present value with the initial investment. Importantly, the discount rate should reflect the riskiness of the benefits. Treynor noticed, however, that when the stream of benefits lasted that long, its present value was extremely sensitive to the choice of discount rate; simply by changing the rate, a desirable project could appear undesirable, and vice versa. Treynor resolved to try to understand the relation between risk and the discount rate, and this was the impetus for his most famous "idea in the rough", the Capital Asset Pricing Model.

Treynor began working in the Operations Research department at the consulting firm Arthur D. Little (ADL) in 1956. In 1958, he spent his three weeks of summer vacation in a cottage in Evergreen, Colorado, and generated 44 pages of mathematical notes on the risk problem. From then on, he spent his weekends working on the paper in his ADL office. Treynor's solution to the capital budgeting problem was that the proper discount rate is the one that the capital markets themselves utilize to discount future cash flows. This is the kernel of CAPM.

By 1960, Treynor had a draft, which in its 1961 incarnation was titled "Market Value, Time, and Risk". He gave a copy to John Lintner at Harvard University, the only economist he knew even slightly, but Lintner failed to give Treynor any encouragement. One of Treynor's Chicago-trained ADL colleagues, Stephen Sobotka, sent the draft to Merton Miller. Miller and Modigliani had co-authored their great 1958 and 1963 papers while Modigliani was teaching at Northwestern University. Now Modigliani was moving to MIT, and he called Treynor and invited him to lunch. Modigliani said it was clear from the draft that Treynor needed to come to MIT and study economics, to "learn the lingo", and Treynor decided to take a one-year sabbatical from ADL to study at MIT. Since the first part of Treynor's draft dealt with the one-period problem, Modigliani suggested breaking the paper into two and naming that part "Toward a Theory of the Market Value of Risky Assets". Treynor took his advice, and presented the first part to the finance faculty seminar in the fall of 1962 and the second part, titled "Implications for the Theory of Finance", in the spring of 1963. Later, months after Treynor was back working at ADL, Modigliani called to tell him about William F. Sharpe’s CAPM paper, and suggested that Treynor and Sharpe exchange drafts. "Toward a Theory of the Market Value of Risky Assets" was not published until it appeared in 1999 in Robert Korajczyk's book, Asset Pricing and Portfolio Performance. This paper is also presented in the "Risk" section of Treynor's 2007 book, Treynor on Institutional Investing and available on the Social Science Research Network.

After Treynor's return to ADL his manager, Martin Ernst, asked him if this work had any practical applications; Treynor suggested several applications and Ernst focused on performance measurement. The result was two Harvard Business Review articles, the first, titled "How to Rate Management of Investment Funds", on measuring selection, appeared in 1965; the second (with Kay Mazuy), titled "Can Mutual Funds Outguess the Market?", on measuring timing, followed in 1966.

When Fischer Black arrived at ADL in 1965, he took an interest in Treynor's work. After Donald Regan hired Treynor in 1966 to work for him at Merrill Lynch, Black inherited Treynor's ADL case work. Treynor and Black coauthored three published papers, Treynor and Black (1972), Treynor and Black (1973) (both concerned with the Treynor-Black model for portfolio construction) and Treynor and Black (1976); in the latter, Black radically rethought and rewrote Treynor's second MIT presentation from 1963, publishing it, titled "Corporate Investment Decisions", as chapter 16 in Myers’ 1976 compilation, Modern Developments in Financial Management.

Treynor went on to apply his theories for practical purposes in the investment industry. He shared his wealth of knowledge with a younger generation by teaching at several universities. He served a dozen years as the editor of the Financial Analysts Journal, helping authors to present their ideas coherently and with clarity. Many of his papers over the years were published in the FAJ, some as articles and some as editorial commentary. Some of Treynor's writings were originally published under his own name and others under his nom de plume, "Walter Bagehot". A substantial number of these papers won awards, including the FAJ's Graham and Dodd award and the Roger F. Murray Prize.

His ruminations covered a broad swath of the investment universe, including risk, performance measurement, micro- and macroeconomics, trading, accounting, investment value, active management, pensions, and other miscellaneous papers.

In 2007, the International Association of Financial Engineers (IAFE) named Treynor as the 2007 IAFE/SunGard Financial Engineer of the Year (FEOY), recognizing him for his preeminent contributions to financial theory and practice, particularly the essence of the capital asset pricing model. He died on May 11, 2016, at the age of 86.

== See also ==
- Treynor ratio
- Treynor dealer model

== Bibliography ==
- Treynor, Jack L. (1961). "Market Value, Time, and Risk". Unpublished manuscript dated 8/8/61, No. 95-209.
- Treynor, Jack L. (1962). "Toward a Theory of Market Value of Risky Assets". Unpublished manuscript. Subsequently, published as Chapter 2 of Korajczyk (1999).
- Treynor, Jack L. (1963). "Implications for the Theory of Finance". Unpublished manuscript.
- Treynor, Jack L. (1965). "How to Rate Management of Investment Funds". Harvard Business Review 43, pp. 63–75.
- Treynor, Jack L. (2007). Treynor on Institutional Investing. Hoboken: Wiley Finance.
- Treynor, Jack L. and Fischer Black (1972). "Portfolio Selection Using Special Information, under the assumptions of the Diagonal Model, with Mean-Variance Portfolio Objectives, and without Constraints", pp. 367–84 in Mathematical Methods in Investment and Finance 4, edited by George P. Szego and Karl Shell. Amsterdam: North-Holland.
- Treynor, Jack L. and Fischer Black (1973). "How to use Security Analysis to Improve Portfolio Selection". Journal of Business 46, No.1, pp. 66–86.
- Treynor, Jack L. and Fischer Black (1976). "Corporate Investment Decisions", pp. 310–27 in Modern Developments in Financial Management, edited by Stewart C. Myers. New York: Praeger.
- Treynor, Jack L. and Kay Mazuy (1966). "Can Mutual Funds Outguess the Market?" Harvard Business Review 44, pp. 131–136.
- Treynor, Jack L., William L. Priest Jr., Lawrence Fisher and Catherine A. Higgins (1968). "Using Portfolio Composition to Estimate Risk". Financial Analysts Journal 24 (No. 5, Sep/Oct), pp. 93–100.
- Treynor, Jack L. and Richard F. Vancil (1956). "Machine Tool Leasing". Boston: Management Analysis Center.
- Treynor, Jack L. and Wayne Wagner (1983). "Implementation of Portfolio Building: Execution", chapter 12 in Managing Investment Portfolios, A Dynamic Process, Second edition (student edition), edited by John L. Maginn and Donald L. Tuttle. Boston: Warren, Gorham & Lamont.

== Sources ==
- Bernstein, Peter L. (1992). Capital Ideas: The Improbable Origins of Modern Wall Street. New York: The Free Press.
- French, Craig W. (2002). "Jack Treynor's 'Toward a Theory of Market Value of Risky Assets'". Available at https://ssrn.com/abstract=628187
- French, Craig W. (2003). "The Treynor Capital Asset Pricing Model". Journal of Investment Management, Vol.2, No. 1, second quarter, pp. 60–72. Available at https://www.joim.com
- Korajczyk, Robert A. (1999). Asset Pricing and Portfolio Performance: Models, Strategy and Performance Metrics. London: Risk Books.
- Mehrling, Perry (2005). Fischer Black and the Revolutionary Idea of Finance. Hoboken: Wiley Finance.
- Mehta, Nina (2006). "FEN One on One Interview: Jack Treynor". Financial Engineering News Issue No. 49, May/June, pp. 5–12.
- Myers, Stuart C., editor. (1976). Modern Developments in Financial Management. Hinsdale: The Dryden Press.
