= List of Nobel Memorial Prize laureates in Economic Sciences =

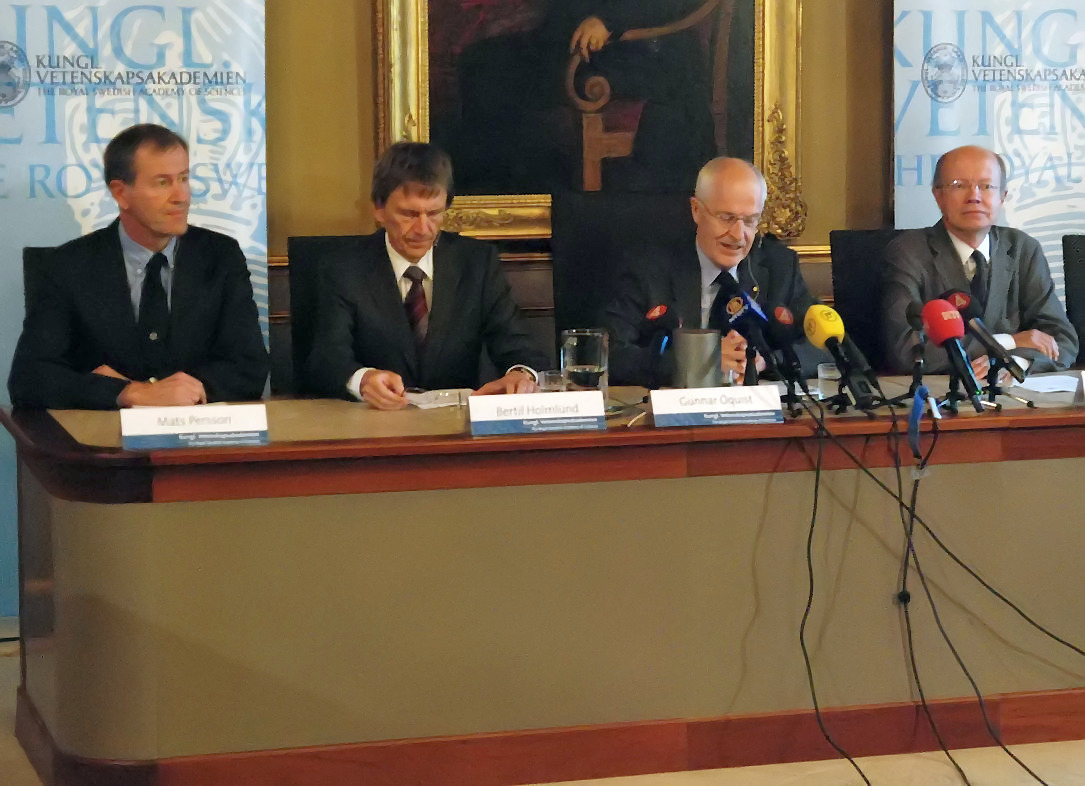
The announcement of the 2008 Nobel Memorial Prize in Economic Sciences in Nobel Prize Press Conference. The laureate of the Prize was Paul Krugman.

The Nobel Memorial Prize in Economic Sciences, officially the Sveriges Riksbank Prize in Economic Sciences in Memory of Alfred Nobel (Swedish: Sveriges riksbanks pris i ekonomisk vetenskap till Alfred Nobels minne), commonly referred to as the Nobel Prize in Economics, is an award in the field of Economic Sciences administered by the Nobel Foundation.

The first Prize in Economic Sciences was awarded in 1969 to Ragnar Frisch and Jan Tinbergen. Each recipient receives a medal, a diploma and a monetary award that has varied throughout the years. In 1969, Frisch and Tinbergen were given a combined 375,000 SEK, which is equivalent to 2,871,041 SEK in December 2007. The award is presented in Stockholm at an annual ceremony on December 10, the anniversary of Nobel's death.

As of the awarding of the 2023 prize, 55 Prizes in Economic Sciences have been given to 93 individuals. As of October 2023, the department of economics with the most affiliated laureates in economic sciences is the University of Chicago, with 16 affiliated laureates. As of 2023, the institutions with the most PhD (or equivalent) graduates who went on to receive the prize are Harvard University and MIT (13 each), followed by the University of Chicago (10). As of 2024, the institutions with the most affiliated faculty at the time of the award are the University of Chicago (15), followed by MIT (10), then by Princeton University and Harvard University (8 each).

== Laureates ==
Year	Name	Country	Rationale	Highest education	Affiliation (Note: Most significant tenure/at time of receipt)	Key contributions (non-exhaustive)
1969	Ragnar Frisch (1895–1973)	Norway	"for having developed and applied dynamic models for the analysis of economic processes"	University of Oslo (Dr. Philos., mathematical statistics)	University of Oslo	Frisch–Waugh–Lovell theorem, Conjectural variation
1969	Jan Tinbergen (1903–1994)	Netherlands	"for having developed and applied dynamic models for the analysis of economic processes"	Leiden University (PhD, economics and physics)	Erasmus University	Econometrics, Policy instruments
1970	Paul Samuelson (1915–2009)	United States	"for the scientific work through which he has developed static and dynamic economic theory and actively contributed to raising the level of analysis in economic science"	Harvard University (PhD, economics)	Massachusetts Institute of Technology	Revealed preference, Samuelson condition, Social Welfare Function, Efficient-market hypothesis, Turnpike theory, Balassa–Samuelson effect, Stolper–Samuelson theorem, Overlapping generations model
1971	Simon Kuznets (1901–1985)	United States	"for his empirically founded interpretation of economic growth which has led to new and deepened insight into the economic and social structure and process of development"	Columbia University (PhD, economics)	Harvard University	Gross domestic product, Capital formation, Kuznets cycle, Kuznets curve
1972	Kenneth Arrow (1921–2017)	United States	"for their pioneering contributions to general economic equilibrium theory and welfare theory"	Columbia University (PhD, economics)	Harvard University	Fundamental theorems of welfare economics, Arrow's impossibility theorem, Arrow–Debreu model, Endogenous growth theory,
1972	John Hicks (1904–1989)	United Kingdom	"for their pioneering contributions to general economic equilibrium theory and welfare theory"	University of Oxford (BA, philosophy, politics, and economics)	University of Oxford	IS–LM model, Hicksian demand function, substitution effect, income effect, Kaldor–Hicks efficiency
1973	Wassily Leontief (1905–1999)	Soviet Union; United States	"for the development of the input-output method and for its application to important economic problems"	University of Berlin (PhD, economics)	Harvard University	Input–output model, Leontief paradox
1974	Friedrich Hayek (1899–1992)	Austria; United Kingdom	"for their pioneering work in the theory of money and economic fluctuations and for their penetrating analysis of the interdependence of economic, social and institutional phenomena"	University of Vienna (Dr. Jur.; Dr. rer. pol.)	London School of Economics; University of Chicago; University of Freiburg; University of Salzburg	Austrian business cycle theory, Economic calculation problem, Spontaneous order, Information economics
1974	Gunnar Myrdal (1898–1987)	Sweden	"for their pioneering work in the theory of money and economic fluctuations and for their penetrating analysis of the interdependence of economic, social and institutional phenomena"	Stockholm University (PhD, economics)	Stockholm University	Circular cumulative causation
1975	Leonid Kantorovich (1912–1986)	Soviet Union	"for their contributions to the theory of optimum allocation of resources"	Leningrad State University (PhD, mathematics)	Novosibirsk State University	Linear programming, Kantorovich theorem, Kantorovich inequality, Kantorovich metric
1975	Tjalling Koopmans (1910–1985)	Netherlands; United States	"for their contributions to the theory of optimum allocation of resources"	University of Leiden (PhD, mathematics)	University of Chicago; Yale University	Linear programming, Transport economics, Ramsey–Cass–Koopmans model, Koopmans' theorem
1976	Milton Friedman (1912–2006)	United States	"for his achievements in the fields of consumption analysis, monetary history and theory and for his demonstration of the complexity of stabilisation policy"	Columbia University (PhD, economics)	University of Chicago	Monetarism, Permanent income hypothesis, Natural rate of unemployment, Sequential analysis, Helicopter money, Great Contraction, Friedman rule, Friedman–Savage utility function, Friedman test
1977	James Meade (1907–1995)	United Kingdom	"for their pathbreaking contribution to the theory of international trade and international capital movements"	University of Oxford (BA, PPE)	University of Cambridge	Nominal income target
1977	Bertil Ohlin (1899–1979)	Sweden	"for their pathbreaking contribution to the theory of international trade and international capital movements"	Stockholm University (PhD, economics)	Stockholm School of Economics	Heckscher–Ohlin model
1978	Herbert A. Simon (1916–2001)	United States	"for his pioneering research into the decision-making process within economic organizations"	University of Chicago (PhD, political science)	Carnegie Mellon University	Bounded rationality, satisficing, preferential attachment
1979	W. Arthur Lewis (1915–1991)	Saint Lucia; United Kingdom	"for their pioneering research into economic development research with particular consideration of the problems of developing countries"	London School of Economics (PhD, economics)	Princeton University	Lewis model, Lewis turning point
1979	Theodore Schultz (1902–1998)	United States	"for their pioneering research into economic development research with particular consideration of the problems of developing countries"	University of Wisconsin–Madison (PhD, agricultural economics)	University of Chicago	Human Capital Theory
1980	Lawrence Klein (1920–2013)	United States	"for the creation of econometric models and the application to the analysis of economic fluctuations and economic policies"	Massachusetts Institute of Technology (PhD, economics)	University of Pennsylvania	Macroeconomic forecasting (LINK project)
1981	James Tobin (1918–2002)	United States	"for his analysis of financial markets and their relations to expenditure decisions, employment, production and prices"	Harvard University (PhD, economics)	Yale University	Tobin tax, Tobit model, Tobin's q, Baumol–Tobin model
1982	George Stigler (1911–1991)	United States	"for his seminal studies of industrial structures, functioning of markets and causes and effects of public regulation"	University of Chicago (PhD, economics)	University of Chicago	Regulatory capture
1983	Gérard Debreu (1921–2004)	France	"for having incorporated new analytical methods into economic theory and for his rigorous reformulation of the theory of general equilibrium"	University of Paris (PhD, economics)	University of California, Berkeley	Arrow–Debreu model, Sonnenschein–Mantel–Debreu theorem
1984	Richard Stone (1913–1991)	United Kingdom	"for having made fundamental contributions to the development of systems of national accounts and hence greatly improved the basis for empirical economic analysis"	University of Cambridge (BA, law and economics; ScD, economics)	University of Cambridge	National accounts
1985	Franco Modigliani (1918–2003)	Italy	"for his pioneering analyses of saving and of financial markets"	The New School for Social Research (PhD, economics)	Massachusetts Institute of Technology	Modigliani–Miller theorem, Life-cycle hypothesis
1986	James M. Buchanan (1919–2013)	United States	"for his development of the contractual and constitutional bases for the theory of economic and political decision-making"	University of Chicago (PhD, economics)	George Mason University	Constitutional economics
1987	Robert Solow (1924–2023)	United States	"for his contributions to the theory of economic growth"	Harvard University (PhD, economics)	Massachusetts Institute of Technology	Solow–Swan model
1988	Maurice Allais (1911–2010)	France	"for his pioneering contributions to the theory of markets and efficient utilization of resources"	University of Paris, Faculty of Science (Doctor-Engineer)	École Nationale Supérieure des Mines de Paris; Paris Nanterre University	OLG model, Allais paradox, Golden Rule savings rate
1989	Trygve Haavelmo (1911–1999)	Norway	"for his clarification of the probability theory foundations of econometrics and his analyses of simultaneous economic structures"	University of Oslo (PhD, economics)	University of Oslo	Balanced budget multiplier
1990	Harry Markowitz (1927–2023)	United States	"for their pioneering work in the theory of financial economics"	University of Chicago (PhD, economics)	City University of New York	Modern portfolio theory, Markowitz model, Efficient frontier
1990	Merton Miller (1923–2000)	United States	"for their pioneering work in the theory of financial economics"	Johns Hopkins University (PhD, economics)	Carnegie Mellon University; University of Chicago	Modigliani–Miller theorem
1990	William F. Sharpe (1934–present)	United States	"for their pioneering work in the theory of financial economics"	University of California, Los Angeles (PhD, economics)	Stanford University	Sharpe Ratio, Binomial options pricing model, Returns-based style analysis
1991	Ronald Coase (1910–2013)	United Kingdom	"for his discovery and clarification of the significance of transaction costs and property rights for the institutional structure and functioning of the economy"	London School of Economics (PhD, economics)	University of Chicago; London School of Economics	Transaction costs, Coase theorem, Coase conjecture
1992	Gary Becker (1930–2014)	United States	"for having extended the domain of microeconomic analysis to a wide range of human behaviour and interaction, including non-market behaviour"	University of Chicago (PhD, economics)	University of Chicago	Human Capital Theory
1993	Robert Fogel (1926–2013)	United States	"for having renewed research in economic history by applying economic theory and quantitative methods in order to explain economic and institutional change"	Johns Hopkins University (PhD, economics)	University of Chicago	Cliometrics
1993	Douglass North (1920–2015)	United States	"for having renewed research in economic history by applying economic theory and quantitative methods in order to explain economic and institutional change"	University of California, Berkeley (PhD, economics)	Washington University in St. Louis	Cliometrics
1994	John Harsanyi (1920–2000)	Hungary; United States	"for their pioneering analysis of equilibria in the theory of non-cooperative games"	University of Budapest (PhD, philosophy and sociology); Stanford University (PhD, economics)	University of California, Berkeley	Bayesian game, Preference utilitarianism, Equilibrium selection
1994	John Forbes Nash Jr. (1928–2015)	United States	"for their pioneering analysis of equilibria in the theory of non-cooperative games"	Princeton University (PhD, mathematics)	Princeton University	Nash equilibrium, Nash embedding theorem, Nash functions, Nash–Moser theorem
1994	Reinhard Selten (1930–2016)	Germany	"for their pioneering analysis of equilibria in the theory of non-cooperative games"	Goethe University Frankfurt (PhD, mathematics)	University of Bonn	Experimental economics
1995	Robert Lucas Jr. (1937–2023)	United States	"for having developed and applied the hypothesis of rational expectations, and thereby having transformed macroeconomic analysis and deepened our understanding of economic policy"	University of Chicago (PhD, economics)	University of Chicago	Rational expectations, Lucas critique, Lucas paradox, Lucas aggregate supply function, Uzawa–Lucas model
1996	James Mirrlees (1936–2018)	United Kingdom	"for their fundamental contributions to the economic theory of incentives under asymmetric information"	University of Cambridge (PhD, economics)	University of Oxford; University of Cambridge	Optimal labor income taxation
1996	William Vickrey (1914–1996)	Canada; United States	"for their fundamental contributions to the economic theory of incentives under asymmetric information"	Columbia University (PhD, economics)	Columbia University	Vickrey auction, Revenue equivalence, Congestion pricing
1997	Robert C. Merton (1944–present)	United States	"for a new method to determine the value of derivatives"	Massachusetts Institute of Technology (PhD, economics)	Massachusetts Institute of Technology	Black–Scholes–Merton model, ICAPM, Merton's portfolio problem
1997	Myron Scholes (1941–present)	Canada; United States	"for a new method to determine the value of derivatives"	University of Chicago (PhD, economics)	Stanford University	Black–Scholes–Merton model
1998	Amartya Sen (1933–present)	India	"for his contributions to welfare economics"	University of Cambridge (PhD, economics)	Harvard University; University of Cambridge	Human development theory, Capability approach
1999	Robert Mundell (1932–2021)	Canada	"for his analysis of monetary and fiscal policy under different exchange rate regimes and his analysis of optimum currency areas"	Massachusetts Institute of Technology (PhD, economics)	University of British Columbia	Optimum currency area, Supply-side economics, Mundell–Fleming model, Mundell–Tobin effect
2000	James Heckman (1944–present)	United States	"for his development of theory and methods for analyzing selective samples"	Princeton University (PhD, economics)	University of Chicago	Heckman correction
2000	Daniel McFadden (1937–present)	United States	"for his development of theory and methods for analyzing discrete choice"	University of Minnesota (PhD, behavioural science, economics)	University of California, Berkeley; Massachusetts Institute of Technology	Discrete choice models
2001	George Akerlof (1940–present)	United States	"for their analyses of markets with information asymmetry"	Massachusetts Institute of Technology (PhD, economics)	Georgetown University; University of California, Berkeley	Adverse selection (The Market for Lemons), Efficiency wage, Identity economics
2001	Michael Spence (1943–present)	United States	"for their analyses of markets with information asymmetry"	Harvard University (PhD, economics)	Harvard University	Signalling theory
2001	Joseph Stiglitz (1943–present)	United States	"for their analyses of markets with information asymmetry"	Massachusetts Institute of Technology (PhD, economics)	Princeton University; Columbia University	Screening theory, Henry George theorem, Shapiro–Stiglitz theory
2002	Daniel Kahneman (1934–2024)	Israel; United States	"for having integrated insights from psychological research into economic science, especially concerning human judgment and decision-making under uncertainty"	University of California, Berkeley (PhD, psychology)	Princeton University; University of British Columbia	Behavioral economics, Prospect theory, loss aversion, cognitive biases
2002	Vernon L. Smith (1927–present)	United States	"for having established laboratory experiments as a tool in empirical economic analysis, especially in the study of alternative market mechanisms"	Harvard University (PhD, economics)	University of Arizona George Mason University	Experimental economics, Combinatorial auction
2003	Robert F. Engle (1942–present)	United States	"for methods of analyzing economic time series with time-varying volatility (ARCH)"	Cornell University (PhD, economics)	University of California, San Diego	ARCH
2003	Clive Granger (1934–2009)	United Kingdom	"for methods of analyzing economic time series with common trends (cointegration)"	University of Nottingham (PhD, statistics)	University of California, San Diego	Cointegration, Granger causality
2004	Finn E. Kydland (1943–present)	Norway	"for their contributions to dynamic macroeconomics: the time consistency of economic policy and the driving forces behind business cycles"	Carnegie Mellon University (PhD, economics)	University of California, Santa Barbara	RBC theory, Dynamic inconsistency in monetary policy
2004	Edward C. Prescott (1940–2022)	United States	"for their contributions to dynamic macroeconomics: the time consistency of economic policy and the driving forces behind business cycles"	Carnegie Mellon University (PhD, economics)	Carnegie Mellon University; Arizona State University; University of Minnesota	Hodrick-Prescott filter
2005	Robert Aumann (1930–present)	Israel; United States	"for having enhanced our understanding of conflict and cooperation through game-theory analysis"	Massachusetts Institute of Technology (PhD, mathematics)	Hebrew University of Jerusalem	Correlated equilibrium, Aumann's agreement theorem
2005	Thomas Schelling (1921–2016)	United States	"for having enhanced our understanding of conflict and cooperation through game-theory analysis"	Harvard University (PhD, economics)	Yale University; Harvard University	Schelling point, Egonomics
2006	Edmund Phelps (1933–2026)	United States	"for his analysis of intertemporal tradeoffs in macroeconomic policy"	Yale University (PhD, economics)	Columbia University	Golden Rule savings rate, Natural rate of unemployment, Statistical discrimination
2007	Leonid Hurwicz (1917–2008)	Poland; United States	"for having laid the foundations of mechanism design theory"	University of Warsaw (Magister Juris, law); London School of Economics (incomplete PhD, economics)	University of Minnesota; Iowa State University	Mechanism design
2007	Eric Maskin (1950–present)	United States	"for having laid the foundations of mechanism design theory"	Harvard University (PhD, applied mathematics)	Harvard University	Mechanism design
2007	Roger Myerson (1951–present)	United States	"for having laid the foundations of mechanism design theory"	Harvard University (PhD, applied mathematics)	Northwestern University	Mechanism design
2008	Paul Krugman (1953–present)	United States	"for his analysis of trade patterns and location of economic activity"	Massachusetts Institute of Technology (PhD, economics)	Princeton University	New trade theory, New Economic Geography, Home market effect
2009	Elinor Ostrom (1933–2012)	United States	"for her analysis of economic governance, especially the commons"	University of California, Los Angeles (PhD, political science)	Indiana University	Institutional Analysis and Development framework
2009	Oliver E. Williamson (1932–2020)	United States	"for his analysis of economic governance, especially the boundaries of the firm"	Carnegie Mellon University (PhD, economics)	University of Pennsylvania; University of California, Berkeley	New institutional economics
2010	Peter Diamond (1940–present)	United States	"for their analysis of markets with search frictions"	Massachusetts Institute of Technology (PhD, economics)	Massachusetts Institute of Technology	Diamond–Mirrlees efficiency theorem, Diamond coconut model
2010	Dale T. Mortensen (1939–2014)	United States	"for their analysis of markets with search frictions"	Carnegie Mellon University (PhD, economics)	Northwestern University	Matching theory
2010	Christopher A. Pissarides (1948–present)	Cyprus; United Kingdom	"for their analysis of markets with search frictions"	London School of Economics (PhD, economics)	London School of Economics	Matching theory
2011	Thomas J. Sargent (1943–present)	United States	"for their empirical research on cause and effect in the macroeconomy"	Harvard University (PhD, economics)	Hoover Institution; University of Minnesota	Policy-ineffectiveness proposition
2011	Christopher A. Sims (1942–2026)	United States	"for their empirical research on cause and effect in the macroeconomy"	Harvard University (PhD, economics)	University of Minnesota Princeton University	Vector autoregression in macroeconomics, Fiscal theory of the price level, Rational inattention
2012	Alvin E. Roth (1951–present)	United States	"for the theory of stable allocations and the practice of market design"	Stanford University (PhD, operations research)	Stanford University; Harvard University	Stable marriage problem, Repugnancy costs
2012	Lloyd Shapley (1923–2016)	United States	"for the theory of stable allocations and the practice of market design"	Princeton University (PhD, mathematics)	University of California, Los Angeles	Shapley value, stochastic game, Potential game, Shapley–Shubik power index, Bondareva–Shapley theorem, Gale–Shapley algorithm, Shapley–Folkman lemma
2013	Eugene Fama (1939–present)	United States	"for their empirical analysis of asset prices"	University of Chicago (MBA; PhD, business)	University of Chicago	Fama–French three-factor model, Weak, semi-strong, and strong efficient-market hypothesis
2013	Lars Peter Hansen (1952–present)	United States	"for their empirical analysis of asset prices"	University of Minnesota (PhD, economics)	University of Chicago	Generalized method of moments
2013	Robert J. Shiller (1946–present)	United States	"for their empirical analysis of asset prices"	Massachusetts Institute of Technology (PhD, economics)	Yale University	Case–Shiller index, CAPE Index
2014	Jean Tirole (1953–present)	France	"for his analysis of market power and regulation"	Massachusetts Institute of Technology (PhD, economics)	Massachusetts Institute of Technology; Toulouse School of Economics; School for Advanced Studies in the Social Sciences	Markov perfect equilibrium, Two-sided market
2015	Angus Deaton (1945–present)	United Kingdom; United States	"for his analysis of consumption, poverty, and welfare"	University of Cambridge (PhD, economics)	Princeton University	Almost ideal demand system, Pseudo panels, Household surveys in developing countries
2016	Oliver Hart (1948–present)	United Kingdom; United States	"for their contributions to contract theory"	Princeton University (PhD, economics)	Harvard University	Moral Hazard, Incomplete contracts
2016	Bengt R. Holmström (1949–present)	Finland	"for their contributions to contract theory"	Stanford University (PhD, operations research)	Massachusetts Institute of Technology	Informativeness Principle
2017	Richard Thaler (1945–present)	United States	"for his contributions to behavioural economics"	University of Rochester (PhD, economics)	Cornell University; University of Chicago	Nudge theory, Mental accounting, Choice architecture
2018	William Nordhaus (1941–2026)	United States	"for integrating climate change into long-run macroeconomic analysis"	Massachusetts Institute of Technology (PhD, economics)	Yale University	DICE model
2018	Paul Romer (1955–present)	United States	"for integrating technological innovations into long-run macroeconomic analysis"	University of Chicago (PhD, economics)	New York University	Incorporation of R&D to the Endogenous growth theory
2019	Abhijit Banerjee (1961–present)	United States	"for their experimental approach to alleviating global poverty"	Harvard University (PhD, economics)	Massachusetts Institute of Technology	Use of RCTs in development economics
2019	Esther Duflo (1972–present)	France; United States	"for their experimental approach to alleviating global poverty"	Massachusetts Institute of Technology (PhD, economics)	Massachusetts Institute of Technology	Use of RCTs in development economics
2019	Michael Kremer (1964–present)	United States	"for their experimental approach to alleviating global poverty"	Harvard University (PhD, economics)	Harvard University	Use of RCTs in development economics
2020	Paul Milgrom (1948–present)	United States	"for improvements to auction theory and inventions of new auction formats"	Stanford University (PhD, business)	Stanford University	Simultaneous multiple round auctions (SMRA), No-trade theorem, Market design, Reputation effects (game theory), supermodular games, monotone comparative statics, Linkage principle, Deferred-acceptance auction
2020	Robert B. Wilson (1937–present)	United States	"for improvements to auction theory and inventions of new auction formats"	Harvard University (DBA)	Stanford University	Simultaneous multiple round auctions (SMRA), Common value auction, Reputation effects (game theory), Wilson doctrine
2021	David Card (1956–present)	Canada; United States	"for his empirical contributions to labour economics"	Princeton University (PhD, economics)	University of California, Berkeley	Natural experiments on labour economics (incl. Difference in differences)
2021	Joshua Angrist (1960–present)	Israel; United States	"for their methodological contributions to the analysis of causal relationships"	Princeton University (PhD, economics)	Massachusetts Institute of Technology	Local average treatment effect, natural experiments to estimate causal links
2021	Guido Imbens (1963–present)	Netherlands; United States	"for their methodological contributions to the analysis of causal relationships"	Brown University (PhD, economics)	Stanford University	Local average treatment effect, natural experiments to estimate causal links
2022	Ben Bernanke (1953–present)	United States	"for research on banks and financial crises"	Massachusetts Institute of Technology (PhD, economics)	Princeton University; Brookings Institution	Analysis of the Great Depression
2022	Douglas Diamond (1953–present)	United States	"for research on banks and financial crises"	Yale University (PhD, economics)	University of Chicago	Diamond–Dybvig model
2022	Philip H. Dybvig (1955–present)	United States	"for research on banks and financial crises"	Yale University (PhD, economics)	Washington University in St. Louis	Diamond–Dybvig model
2023	Claudia Goldin (1946–present)	United States	"for having advanced our understanding of women's labour market outcomes"	University of Chicago (PhD, economics)	Harvard University	Analysis of historical experience of women in the economy
2024	Daron Acemoglu (1967–present)	Turkey; United States	"for studies of how institutions are formed and affect prosperity"	London School of Economics (PhD, economics)	Massachusetts Institute of Technology	
2024	Simon Johnson (1963–present)	United Kingdom; United States	"for studies of how institutions are formed and affect prosperity"	Massachusetts Institute of Technology (PhD, economics)	Massachusetts Institute of Technology	
2024	James A. Robinson (1960–present)	United Kingdom; United States	"for studies of how institutions are formed and affect prosperity"	Yale University (PhD, economics)	University of Chicago	
2025	Joel Mokyr (1946–present)	Israel; United States	"for having identified the prerequisites for sustained growth through technological progress"	Yale University (PhD, economics)	Northwestern University	
2025	Philippe Aghion (1956–present)	France	"for the theory of sustained growth through creative destruction"	Harvard University (PhD, economics)	Collège de France; INSEAD; London School of Economics	
2025	Peter Howitt (1946–present)	Canada	"for the theory of sustained growth through creative destruction"	Northwestern University (PhD, economics)	Brown University	
2026	Robert E. Hall (1943–present)	United States	"for microeconomic foundations of macroeconomic stabilisation"	Massachusetts Institute of Technology (PhD, economics)	Stanford University	
2026	Michael Woodford (1955–present)	United States	"for microeconomic foundations of macroeconomic stabilisation"	Massachusetts Institute of Technology (PhD, economics)	Columbia University	

=== List of Economic Nobel laureates by PhD (or equivalent) alma mater ===
Institution	Country	Number of laureates
Massachusetts Institute of Technology	United States	16 (1980, 1997, 1999, 2001, 2001, 2005, 2008, 2010, 2013, 2014, 2018, 2019, 2022, 2024, 2026, 2026); Lawrence Klein, Robert C. Merton, Robert Mundell, Joseph Stiglitz, George Akerlof, Robert J. Aumann, Paul Krugman, Peter A. Diamond, Robert J. Shiller, Jean Tirole, William Nordhaus, Esther Duflo, Ben Bernanke, Simon Johnson, Robert E. Hall, Michael Woodford
Harvard University	United States	14 (1970, 1981, 1987, 2001, 2002, 2005, 2007, 2007, 2011, 2011, 2019, 2019, 2020, 2025); Paul Samuelson, James Tobin, Robert Solow, Michael Spence, Vernon L. Smith, Thomas C. Schelling, Roger Myerson, Eric S. Maskin, Thomas J. Sargent, Christopher A. Sims, Abhijit Banerjee, Michael Kremer, Robert B. Wilson, Philippe Aghion
University of Chicago	United States	10 (1978, 1982, 1986, 1990, 1992, 1995, 1997, 2013, 2018, 2023); Herbert A. Simon, George Stigler, James M. Buchanan, Harry Markowitz, Gary Becker, Robert Lucas, Jr., Myron Scholes, Eugene F. Fama, Paul Romer, Claudia Goldin
Princeton University	United States	6 (1994, 2000, 2012, 2016, 2021, 2021); John Forbes Nash Jr., James Heckman, Lloyd S. Shapley, Oliver Hart, David Card, Joshua Angrist
Yale University	United States	5 (2006, 2022, 2022, 2024, 2025); Edmund S. Phelps, Douglas Diamond, Philip H. Dybvig, James A. Robinson, Joel Mokyr
London School of Economics	United Kingdom	5 (1979, 1992, 2007, 2010, 2024); C. A. Pissarides, L. Hurwicz, R. Coase, W. A. Lewis, Daron Acemoglu
University of Cambridge	United Kingdom	4 (1984, 1996, 1998, 2015); Richard Stone, James Mirrlees, Amartya Sen, Angus Deaton
Carnegie Mellon University	United States	4 (2004, 2004, 2009, 2010); Finn E. Kydland, Edward C. Prescott, Dale T. Mortensen
Columbia University	United States	4 (1971, 1972, 1976, 1996); William Vickrey, Milton Friedman, Kenneth Arrow, Simon Kuznets
Stanford University	United States	4 (1994, 2012, 2016, 2020); Paul Milgrom, Bengt Holmström, Alvin E. Roth, John Harsanyi
Johns Hopkins University	United States	2 (1990, 1993); Merton Miller, Robert Fogel
Leiden University	Netherlands	2 (1969, 1975); Jan Tinbergen, Tjalling Koopmans
Stockholm University	Sweden	2 (1974, 1977); Gunnar Myrdal, Bertil Ohlin
University of California, Berkeley	United States	2 (1993, 2002); Douglass North, Daniel Kahneman
University of California, Los Angeles	United States	2 (1990, 2009); William F. Sharpe, Elinor Ostrom
University of Minnesota	United States	2 (2000, 2013); Daniel McFadden, Lars Peter Hansen
University of Oslo	Norway	2 (1969, 1989); Ragnar Frisch, Trygve Haavelmo
University of Oxford	United Kingdom	2 (1972, 1977); John Hicks, James Meade
University of Paris	France	2 (1983, 1988); Gérard Debreu, Maurice Allais
Brown University	United States	1 (2021); Guido Imbens
Cornell University	United States	1 (2003); Robert F. Engle
Goethe University Frankfurt	Germany	1 (1994); Reinhard Selten
Leningrad State University	Soviet Union	1 (1975); Leonid Kantorovich
The New School for Social Research	United States	1 (1985); Franco Modigliani
Northwestern University	United States	1 (2025); Peter Howitt
University of Berlin	Germany	1 (1973); Wassily Leontief
University of Nottingham	United Kingdom	1 (2003); Clive Granger
University of Rochester	United States	1 (2017); Richard Thaler
University of Vienna	Austria	1 (1974); Friedrich Hayek
University of Wisconsin–Madison	United States	1 (1979); Theodore Schultz

=== List of universities by currently appointed Economic Nobel laureates ===
As of September 2026, the table lists institutions with living Nobel Memorial Prize laureates in Economic Sciences holding primary or other substantial academic appointments.

Institution	Country	Number of laureates
Massachusetts Institute of Technology	United States	8 Daron Acemoglu, Joshua Angrist, Abhijit Banerjee^{†}, Peter A. Diamond, Esther Duflo^{†}, Bengt Holmström, Simon Johnson, Robert C. Merton
Stanford University	United States	8 Guido Imbens, Paul Milgrom, Alvin E. Roth, Thomas J. Sargent^{†}, Myron Scholes, William F. Sharpe, Michael Spence^{†}, Robert B. Wilson
University of Chicago	United States	8 Douglas W. Diamond, Eugene F. Fama, Lars Peter Hansen, James J. Heckman^{†}, Michael Kremer, Roger B. Myerson, James A. Robinson, Richard H. Thaler
Harvard University	United States	4 Claudia Goldin, Oliver Hart, Eric S. Maskin, Amartya Sen
University of California, Berkeley	United States	3 George A. Akerlof^{†}, David Card, Daniel L. McFadden^{†}
University of Southern California	United States	2 Angus Deaton^{†}, Daniel L. McFadden^{†}
London School of Economics and Political Science	United Kingdom	2 Philippe Aghion^{†}, Christopher A. Pissarides^{†}
New York University	United States	2 Robert F. Engle, Thomas J. Sargent^{†}
University of Zurich	Switzerland	2 Abhijit Banerjee^{†}, Esther Duflo^{†}
Yale University	United States	2 William D. Nordhaus, Robert J. Shiller
Princeton University	United States	1 Angus Deaton^{†}
Bocconi University	Italy	1 Michael Spence^{†}
Boston College	United States	1 Paul Romer
Brown University	United States	1 Peter Howitt
Chapman University	United States	1 Vernon L. Smith
Columbia University	United States	1 Joseph E. Stiglitz
CUNY Graduate Center	United States	1 Paul Krugman
Georgetown University	United States	1 George A. Akerlof^{†}
Hebrew University of Jerusalem	Israel	1 Robert Aumann
INSEAD	France	1 Philippe Aghion^{†}
Northwestern University	United States	1 Joel Mokyr
Southwestern University of Finance and Economics	China	1 Philip H. Dybvig
Toulouse School of Economics	France	1 Jean Tirole
University of California, Santa Barbara	United States	1 Finn E. Kydland
University of Cyprus	Cyprus	1 Christopher A. Pissarides^{†}

^{†} Holds a significant concurrent academic appointment at another institution listed in the table.

=== List of Economic Nobel laureates by country ===
Country	Number of laureates
United States	78
United Kingdom	13
Canada	5
France	5
Israel	4
Netherlands	3
Norway	3
Soviet Union	2
Sweden	2
India	2
Austria	1
Cyprus	1
Finland	1
Germany	1
Hungary	1
Italy	1
Poland	1
Saint Lucia	1
Turkey	1

== See also ==
- List of Nobel laureates
- List of nominees for the Nobel Memorial Prize in Economic Sciences
