= Capital asset pricing model =

Finance model linking expected return to systematic risk

Security market line (SML): The SML displays the expected rate of return of an individual security as a function of systematic, non-diversifiable risk (Beta).

In finance, the capital asset pricing model (CAPM) is a model used to determine a theoretically appropriate required rate of return of an asset, to make decisions about adding assets to a well-diversified portfolio. The model takes into account the asset's sensitivity to non-diversifiable risk (also known as systematic risk or market risk), often represented by the quantity beta (β) in the financial industry, as well as the expected return of the market and the expected return of a theoretical risk-free asset.

CAPM assumes a particular form of utility functions (in which only first and second moments matter, that is risk is measured by variance, for example a quadratic utility) or alternatively asset returns whose probability distributions are completely described by the first two moments (for example, the normal distribution) and zero transaction costs (necessary for diversification to get rid of all idiosyncratic risk). Under these conditions, CAPM shows that the cost of equity capital is determined only by beta.

Independently developed by various researchers in the 1960s, CAPM's conceptualization was largely credited to William Sharpe and his contemporary Jack Treynor. Sharpe was later awarded the Nobel Prize in Economic Sciences in 1990 for being "the leading figure" in its development. Despite its failing numerous empirical tests, and the existence of more modern approaches to asset pricing and portfolio selection (such as arbitrage pricing theory and Merton's portfolio problem), the CAPM still remains popular due to its simplicity and utility in a variety of situations.

== Conceptualization ==
The CAPM was introduced by economists Jack Treynor (1961, 1962), William F. Sharpe (1964), John Lintner (1965) and Jan Mossin (1966) independently, building on the earlier work of Harry Markowitz on diversification and modern portfolio theory. Sharpe had developed the idea for CAPM in December 1961 based on results from his dissertation on security market behavior, and later submitted a paper to The Journal of Finance titled "Capital Asset Prices: A Theory of Market Equilibrium Under Conditions of Risk" in 1962. The paper was rejected by editor Harold G. Fraine after an unnamed referee gave it a negative assessment, with the latter stating that Sharpe's assumptions were "preposterous" as to render his subsequent conclusions "uninteresting". Although Sharpe attempted numerous times to submit revised versions of the paper, it would only be published two years later on September 1964 after a new editor, Lawrence Ritter, arrived at the journal.

Sharpe, Markowitz and Merton Miller jointly received the 1990 Nobel Memorial Prize in Economic Sciences for this contribution to the field of financial economics. Sharpe's development of CAPM has been credited by financial economists Andrew Lo and Stephen Foerster with doing "more than any other financial economist to make the investment process more accessible".

== Black CAPM ==
Fischer Black (1972) developed another version of CAPM, called Black CAPM or zero-beta CAPM, that does not assume the existence of a riskless asset. This version replaces the risk-free rate with the return of a "zero-beta portfolio"—a portfolio that has no correlation with the market. This version was found to be more robust against empirical testing, particularly in explaining why the security market line is often flatter than the standard model predicts. This version was more robust against empirical testing and was influential in the widespread adoption of the CAPM.

== Formula ==
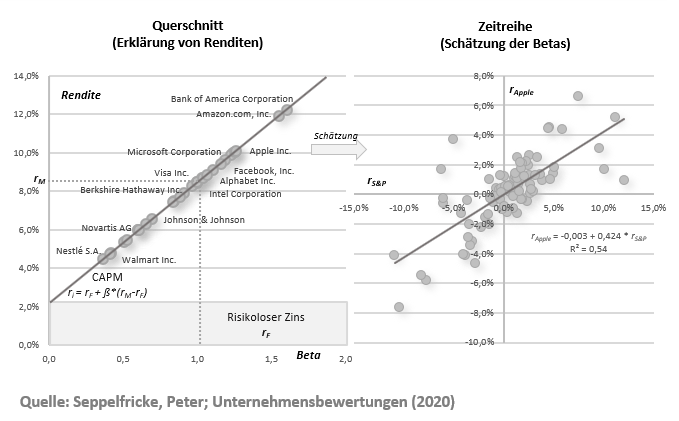
The Security Market Line (SML) showing the relationship between expected return E(Ri) and systematic risk (beta). Assets above the line carry a positive alpha.

The CAPM is a model for pricing an individual security or portfolio. For individual securities, it makes use of the security market line (SML) and its relation to expected return and systematic risk (beta) to show how the market must price individual securities in relation to their security risk class.

The SML enables us to calculate the reward-to-risk ratio for any security in relation to that of the overall market. Therefore, when the expected rate of return for any security is deflated by its beta coefficient, the reward-to-risk ratio for any individual security in the market is equal to the market reward-to-risk ratio, thus:

In equilibrium, all assets should plot directly on the SML. An asset located above the line is considered undervalued, as it offers a higher return for its level of systematic risk, while an asset below is overvalued. The slope of the SML represents the market risk premium, illustrating the trade-off between risk and return. By determining the position of a security relative to this line, investors can identify whether the expected return justifies the asset's market-related volatility.

CAPM Mathematical Framework
Component	Equation / Derivation	Description & Logic
Reward-to-Risk Ratio	:$\frac{E(R_i) - R_f}{\beta_i} = E(R_m) - R_f$	Shows that the risk premium per unit of beta is constant for all assets in the market.
Standard CAPM	:$E(R_i) = R_f + \beta_i (E(R_m) - R_f)$	Obtained by rearranging the reward-to-risk equation to solve for $E(R_i)$. This is the primary model for determining the required return of an asset
Jensen's Alpha	:$E(R_i) = R_f + \beta_i (E(R_m) - R_f) + \alpha_i$	Measures the abnormal return of an asset. A positive $\alpha$ indicates outperformance relative to the SML.
Black CAPM	:$E(R_i) = E(R_z) + \beta_i (E(R_m) - E(R_z))$	A version for restricted borrowing; replaces $R_f$ with the return of a zero-beta portfolio ($E(R_z)$).
Beta Definition	:$\beta_i = \frac{\text{Cov}(R_i, R_m)}{\text{Var}(R_m)} = \rho_{i,m} \frac{\sigma_i}{\sigma_m}$	Measures the sensitivity of the expected excess asset returns to the expected excess market returns.
Risk Premium Form	:$E(R_i) - R_f = \beta_i (E(R_m) - R_f)$	Restates that the individual risk premium equals the market premium multiplied by beta; this form is often used in empirical testing to isolate the excess return.

=== Variable glossary ===
Symbol	Name	Definition / Role
$E(R_i)$	Expected Return	The expected return on the capital asset.
$R_f$	Risk-Free Rate	Interest arising from government bonds or other riskless assets.
$\alpha_i$	Alpha	The active return measuring the distance from the SML, where $\alpha > 0$ indicates an undervalued asset (SCL y-intercept above zero), $\alpha = 0$ fair valuation (SCL y-intercept at origin), and $\alpha < 0$ an overvalued asset (SCL y-intercept below zero).
$E(R_m)$	Market Return	The expected return of the market portfolio.
$E(R_m) - R_f$	Market Premium	The extra return required for market risk exposure.
$E(R_i) - R_f$	Indiv. Risk Premium	The specific reward for an asset's systematic risk.
$\rho_{i,m}$	Correlation	Correlation coefficient between investment i and market m.
$\sigma_i, \sigma_m$	Standard Deviation	Volatility of the investment and the market, respectively.

== Modified betas ==
There has also been research into a mean-reverting beta often referred to as the adjusted beta, as well as the consumption beta. However, in empirical tests, the traditional CAPM has been found to do as well as or outperform these modified beta models. Specifically, research by Mankiw and Shapiro (1986) found that the market beta of the traditional CAPM outperformed the consumption beta in explaining the cross-section of stock returns. Furthermore, while the adjusted beta (Blume's method) improves forecast accuracy, it does not consistently resolve the underlying empirical failures of the model's predictive power over long horizons.

== Security market line ==
The SML graphs the results from the capital asset pricing model (CAPM) formula. The x-axis represents the risk (beta), and the y-axis represents the expected return. The market risk premium is determined from the slope of the SML.

The relationship between $\beta$ and required return is plotted on the security market line (SML), which shows expected return as a function of $\beta$. The intercept is the nominal risk-free rate available for the market, while the slope is the market premium, $E(R_m) - R_f$. The security market line can be regarded as representing a single-factor model of the asset price, where $\beta$ is the exposure to changes in the value of the Market.

$\text{SML}: E(R_i) = R_f + \beta_i (E(R_M) - R_f)$

It is a useful tool for determining if an asset being considered for a portfolio offers a reasonable expected return for its risk. Individual securities are plotted on the SML graph. If the security's expected return versus risk is plotted above the SML, it is undervalued since the investor can expect a greater return for the inherent risk. Conversely, a security plotted below the SML is overvalued since the investor would be accepting less return for the amount of risk assumed.

== Asset pricing ==
Once the expected/required rate of return $E(R_i)$ is calculated using CAPM, we can compare this required rate of return to the asset's estimated rate of return over a specific investment horizon to determine whether it would be an appropriate investment. To make this comparison, you need an independent estimate of the return outlook for the security based on either fundamental or technical analysis techniques, including P/E, M/B etc.

Assuming that the CAPM is correct, an asset is correctly priced when its estimated price is the same as the present value of future cash flows of the asset, discounted at the rate suggested by CAPM. If the estimated price is higher than the CAPM valuation, then the asset is overvalued (and undervalued when the estimated price is below the CAPM valuation). When the asset does not lie on the SML, this could also suggest mis-pricing. Since the expected return of the asset at time $t$ is $E(R_t)=\frac{E(P_{t+1})-P_t}{P_t}$, a higher expected return than what CAPM suggests indicates that $P_t$ is too low (the asset is currently undervalued), assuming that at time $t+1$ the asset returns to the CAPM suggested price.

The asset price $P_0$ using CAPM, sometimes called the certainty equivalent pricing formula, is a linear relationship given by

$$P_0 = \frac{1}{1 + R_f} \left[E(P_T) - \frac{\mathrm{Cov}(P_T,R_M)(E(R_M) - R_f)}{\mathrm{Var}(R_M)}\right]$$

where $P_T$ is the future price of the asset or portfolio.

== Asset-specific required return ==
The CAPM returns the asset-appropriate required return or discount rate—the rate at which future cash flows produced by the asset should be discounted given that asset's relative riskiness. Betas exceeding one signify more than average "riskiness", while betas below one indicate lower than average risk. Thus, a more risky stock will have a higher beta and will be discounted at a higher rate; less sensitive stocks will have lower betas and be discounted at a lower rate. Given the accepted concave utility function, the CAPM is consistent with intuition that investors require a higher return for holding a more risky asset.

Since beta reflects asset-specific sensitivity to non-diversifiable market risk, the market as a whole, by definition, has a beta of one. Stock market indices are frequently used as local proxies for the market—and in that case, by definition, have a beta of one. An investor in a large, diversified portfolio, such as a mutual fund designed to track the total market, therefore expects performance in line with the market.

=== Fundamental Valuation (Present Value) ===
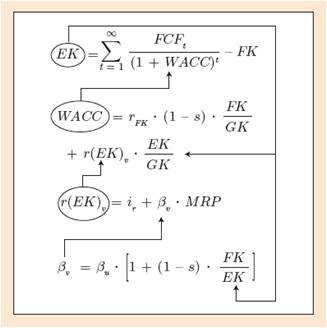
The WACC approach: The cost of equity (derived from CAPM) and the cost of debt are weighted by their market proportions to determine the overall discount rate ($E(R_i)$).

Once the required expected return $E(R_i)$ is established via CAPM, it is used as the discount rate to determine an asset's intrinsic value based on future cash flows (CF).

The intrinsic value is calculated using the following present value formula:

$$PV = \sum_{t=1}^{n} \frac{E(CF_t)}{(1 + E(R_i))^t}$$

An asset is considered undervalued if its calculated $Present Value$ is higher than the current market price, and overvalued if the price exceeds this intrinsic value.

Fundamental Valuation Variables
Variable	Description
PV	The Present Value (intrinsic fair price) today.
E(CF_{t})	The expected cash flow in period t.
E(R_{i})	The CAPM-derived required return (or WACC) used as the discount rate.
n	The total number of periods (time horizon).

== Risk and diversification ==
The risk of a portfolio comprises systematic risk, also known as undiversifiable risk, and unsystematic risk, which is also known as idiosyncratic risk or diversifiable risk. Systematic risk refers to the risk common to all securities—i.e., market risk. Unsystematic risk is the risk associated with individual assets.

Unsystematic risk can be diversified away to smaller levels by including a greater number of assets in the portfolio as specific risks "average out". The same is not possible for systematic risk within one market. Depending on the market, a portfolio of approximately 30–40 securities in developed markets such as the UK or US will render the portfolio sufficiently diversified such that risk exposure is limited to systematic risk only. This number may vary depending on the way securities are weighted in a portfolio which alters the overall risk contribution of each security. For example, market cap weighting means that securities of companies with larger market capitalization will take up a larger portion of the portfolio, making it effectively less diversified. In developing markets, a larger number of securities is required for diversification due to higher asset volatilities.

A rational investor should not take on any diversifiable risk, as only non-diversifiable risks are rewarded within the scope of this model. Therefore, the required return on an asset must be linked to its contribution to overall portfolio riskiness as opposed to its "stand alone risk". In the CAPM context, portfolio risk is represented by higher variance—i.e., less predictability. In other words, the beta of the portfolio is the defining factor in rewarding the systematic exposure taken by an investor.

== Efficient frontier ==
The CAPM assumes that the risk-return profile of a portfolio can be optimized—an optimal portfolio displays the lowest possible level of risk for its level of return.

Additionally, since each additional asset introduced into a portfolio further diversifies the portfolio, the optimal portfolio must comprise every asset with each asset value-weighted to achieve efficiency. This assumes no trading costs and that any asset is infinitely divisible. All such optimal portfolios, i.e., one for each level of return, comprise the efficient frontier. Because the unsystematic risk is diversifiable, the total risk of a portfolio can be viewed as beta.

== Assumptions ==
All investors:

1. Aim to maximize economic utilities (Asset quantities are given and fixed).
2. Are rational and risk-averse.
3. Are broadly diversified across a range of investments.
4. Are price takers, i.e., they cannot influence prices.
5. Can lend and borrow unlimited amounts under the risk free rate of interest.
6. Trade without transaction or taxation costs.
7. Deal with securities that are all highly divisible into small parcels (All assets are perfectly divisible and liquid).
8. Have homogeneous expectations.
9. Have all information available all at the same time.

== Criticisms and empirical evidence ==
In their 2004 review, economists Eugene Fama and Kenneth French argue that "the failure of the CAPM in empirical tests implies that most applications of the model are invalid".

Despite its theoretical importance, the CAPM is often criticized for failing to match real-world market dynamics. The following table provides a comprehensive consolidation of empirical failures, theoretical inconsistencies, and behavioral critiques.

Consolidated Analysis of CAPM Critiques
Category	Specific Problem	Detailed Description, Mathematical Context, and References
Empirical & Statistical	Low-Volatility Anomaly	Data indicates the relationship between risk and return is flatter than predicted. Low-beta stocks offer higher returns than the model predicts, suggesting either the efficient-market hypothesis is wrong or the CAPM is incorrect.
Empirical & Statistical	Predictive Accuracy	The model relies on historical measurements which often fail to reflect future risk or new circumstances. Modern approaches attempt to use "future-risk" betas to resolve this.
Empirical & Statistical	Non-Constant Risk	While CAPM treats $\beta$ as a static constant, empirical studies show that Beta is time-varying and sensitive to different market cycles.
Empirical & Statistical	Size & Value Effects	Anomalies such as the historical outperformance of small-cap and value stocks are not captured by a single-factor beta, leading to multi-factor models.
Theoretical & Logical	Roll's Critique	The "market portfolio" is unobservable as it should theoretically include all assets (real estate, human capital). Using stock indices as proxies can lead to false mathematical inferences.
Theoretical & Logical	Circularity & Irrationality	Critics argue the model is circular because the price of total risk is a function of covariance risk. Furthermore, identical discount rates are often found for different risk levels.
Theoretical & Logical	Measurement of Risk	Assumes variance is the sole measure of risk, ignoring asymmetric downside risk. Investors may prioritize a "Safety-First" approach: $$\text{Minimize } P(R < L)$$ utilizing lower partial moments.
Theoretical & Logical	Market Frictions	The model assumes a frictionless world with no taxes, no transaction costs, and infinitely divisible assets, which does not match actual trading environments.
Theoretical & Logical	Horizon Misalignment	The model assumes short-term optimization. Long-term investors may view inflation-linked bonds, rather than cash, as the true risk-free asset.
Behavioral & Structural	Behavioral Finance	Psychological biases like overconfidence cause market inefficiencies that the linear CAPM cannot capture or explain.
Behavioral & Structural	Mental Accounting	Investors often hold fragmented portfolios for specific goals (e.g., retirement vs. speculation) rather than one single optimized portfolio.
Behavioral & Structural	Skewness Preference	Investors may accept lower returns for assets with high positive skewness (lottery effect). This is modeled by the Co-skewness CAPM: $$E(R_i) - R_f = b_1 \beta + b_2 \frac{E[(R_i - \bar{R}_i)(R_m - \bar{R}_m)^2]}{E[(R_m - \bar{R}_m)^3]}$$

== Extensions of the CAPM ==
To address the empirical and theoretical limitations of the standard CAPM, several extensions have been developed that relax the model's core assumptions.

Key Extensions and Alternative Models
Model	Primary Adjustment	Description and References
Intertemporal CAPM (ICAPM)	Multi-period horizon	Generalizes the model by allowing for multiple dates and repeated portfolio rebalancing.
Consumption CAPM (CCAPM)	Consumption utility	Focuses on how an asset covaries with aggregate consumption rather than market wealth.
Fama–French three-factor model	Size and Value factors	Incorporates anomalies like the size and value effect not explained by standard beta.
Co-skewness CAPM	Higher-order moments	Includes co-skewness as a priced factor, acknowledging skewness preference.
Behavioral portfolio theory	Mental accounting	Proposes that humans hold fragmented portfolios based on specific psychological goals.

Investors with longer-term outlooks might optimally choose long-term inflation-linked bonds instead of short-term rates, suggesting that the relevant risk-free rate depends on the investor's horizon.

== See also ==
- Arbitrage pricing theory
- Build-up method
- Carhart four-factor model
- Chance-constrained portfolio selection
- Consumption beta (CCAPM)
- Fama–French three-factor model
- Intertemporal CAPM (ICAPM)
- Low-volatility anomaly
- Modern portfolio theory
- Roy's safety-first criterion

== Bibliography ==
- Black, Fischer., Michael C. Jensen, and Myron Scholes (1972). The Capital Asset Pricing Model: Some Empirical Tests, pp. 79–121 in M. Jensen ed., Studies in the Theory of Capital Markets. New York: Praeger Publishers.
- Black, F (1972). "Capital market equilibrium with restricted borrowing". J. Bus. 45 (3): 444–455. doi:10.1086/295472.
- Fama, Eugene F. (1968). "Risk, Return and Equilibrium: Some Clarifying Comments". Journal of Finance. 23 (1): 29–40. doi:10.1111/j.1540-6261.1968.tb02996.x.
- Fama, Eugene F.; French, Kenneth (1992). "The Cross-Section of Expected Stock Returns". Journal of Finance. 47 (2): 427–466. doi:10.1111/j.1540-6261.1992.tb04398.x.
- French, Craig W. (2003). The Treynor Capital Asset Pricing Model, Journal of Investment Management, Vol. 1, No. 2, pp. 60–72. Available at http://www.joim.com/
- French, Craig W. (2002). Jack Treynor's 'Toward a Theory of Market Value of Risky Assets' (December). Available at http://ssrn.com/abstract=628187
- Lintner, John (1965). "The valuation of risk assets and the selection of risky investments in stock portfolios and capital budgets". Review of Economics and Statistics. 47 (1): 13–37. doi:10.2307/1924119. JSTOR 1924119.
- Markowitz, Harry M. (1999). "The early history of portfolio theory: 1600–1960". Financial Analysts Journal. 55 (4): 5–16. doi:10.2469/faj.v55.n4.2281.
- Mehrling, Perry (2005). Fischer Black and the Revolutionary Idea of Finance. Hoboken, NJ: John Wiley & Sons, Inc.
- Mossin, Jan (1966). "Equilibrium in a Capital Asset Market". Econometrica. 34 (4): 768–783. doi:10.2307/1910098. JSTOR 1910098.
- Ross, Stephen A. (1977). The Capital Asset Pricing Model (CAPM), Short-sale Restrictions and Related Issues, Journal of Finance, 32 (177)
- Rubinstein, Mark (2006). A History of the Theory of Investments. Hoboken, NJ: John Wiley & Sons, Inc.
- Sharpe, William F. (1964). "Capital asset prices: A theory of market equilibrium under conditions of risk". Journal of Finance. 19 (3): 425–442. doi:10.1111/j.1540-6261.1964.tb02865.x. hdl:10.1111/j.1540-6261.1964.tb02865.x. S2CID 36720630.
- Stone, Bernell K. (1970) Risk, Return, and Equilibrium: A General Single-Period Theory of Asset Selection and Capital-Market Equilibrium. Cambridge: MIT Press.
- Tobin, James (1958). "Liquidity Preference as Behavior towards Risk" (PDF). The Review of Economic Studies. 25 (1): 65–86. doi:10.2307/2296205. JSTOR 2296205. Archived from the original (PDF) on 2020-11-27.
- Treynor, Jack L. (8 August 1961). Market Value, Time, and Risk. Vol. 95–209. Unpublished manuscript.
- Treynor, Jack L. (1962). Toward a Theory of Market Value of Risky Assets. Unpublished manuscript. A final version was published in 1999, in Asset Pricing and Portfolio Performance: Models, Strategy and Performance Metrics. Robert A. Korajczyk (editor) London: Risk Books, pp. 15–22.
- Mullins Jr., David W. (January–February 1982). "Does the capital asset pricing model work?". Harvard Business Review: 105–113.
