= Robert Merton =

Robert Merton may refer to:

- Robert K. Merton (1910–2003), American sociologist
- Robert C. Merton (born 1944), American economist, Nobel Laureate, MIT professor, son of Robert K. Merton
