= Idiosyncrasy =

Unusual personal characteristic

An idiosyncrasy is a unique feature of something. The term is often used to express peculiarity.

== Etymology ==
The term "idiosyncrasy" originates from Greek ἰδιοσυγκρασία idiosynkrasía, "a peculiar temperament, habit of body" (from ἴδιος idios, "one's own", σύν syn, "with" and κρᾶσις krasis, "blend of the four humors" (temperament) or literally "particular mingling".

Idiosyncrasy is sometimes used as a synonym for eccentricity, as these terms "are not always clearly distinguished when they denote an act, a practice, or a characteristic that impresses the observer as strange or singular." Eccentricity, however, "emphasizes the idea of divergence from the usual or customary; idiosyncrasy implies a following of one's particular temperament or bent especially in trait, trick, or habit; the former often suggests mental aberration, the latter, strong individuality and independence of action".

== Linguistics ==
The term can also be applied to symbols or words. Idiosyncratic symbols mean one thing for a particular person, as a blade could mean war, but to someone else, it could symbolize a surgery.

=== Idiosyncratic property ===
In phonology, an idiosyncratic property contrasts with a systematic regularity. While systematic regularities in the sound system of a language are useful for identifying phonological rules during analysis of the forms morphemes can take, idiosyncratic properties are those whose occurrence is not determined by those rules. For example, the fact that the English word cab starts with the sound /k/ is an idiosyncratic property; on the other hand that its vowel is longer than in the English word cap is a systematic regularity, as it arises from the fact that the final consonant is voiced rather than voiceless.

== Medicine ==
=== Disease ===
Idiosyncrasy defined the way physicians conceived diseases in the 19th century. They considered each disease as a unique condition, related to each patient. This understanding began to change in the 1870s, when discoveries made by researchers in Europe permitted the advent of a "scientific medicine", a precursor to the evidence-based medicine that is the standard of practice today.

=== Pharmacology ===
The term idiosyncratic drug reaction denotes an aberrant or bizarre reaction or hypersensitivity to a substance, without connection to the pharmacology of the drug. It is what is known as a Type B reaction. Type B reactions have the following characteristics: they are usually unpredictable, might not be picked up by toxicological screening, not necessarily dose-related, incidence and morbidity low but mortality is high. Type B reactions are most commonly immunological (e.g. penicillin allergy).

=== Psychiatry and psychology ===
The word is used for the personal way a given individual reacts, perceives and experiences: a certain dish made of meat may cause nostalgic memories in one person and disgust in another. These reactions are called idiosyncratic.

== Economics and finance ==
In portfolio theory, risks of price changes due to the unique circumstances of a specific security, as opposed to the overall market, are called "idiosyncratic risks". This specific risk, also called unsystematic, can be nulled out of a portfolio through diversification. Pooling multiple securities means the specific risks cancel out. In complete markets, there is no compensation for idiosyncratic risk—that is, a security's idiosyncratic risk does not matter for its price. For instance, in a complete market in which the capital asset pricing model holds, the price of a security is determined by the amount of systematic risk in its returns. Net income received, or losses suffered, by a landlord from renting of one or two properties is subject to idiosyncratic risk due to the numerous things that can happen to real property and variable behavior of tenants.

According to one macroeconomic model including a financial sector, hedging idiosyncratic risk can be self-defeating as amid the "risk reduction" experts are encouraged to increase their leverage. This works for small shocks but leads to higher vulnerability for larger shocks and makes the system less stable. Thus, while securitisation in principle reduces the costs of idiosyncratic shocks, it ends up amplifying systemic risks in equilibrium.

In econometrics, "idiosyncratic error" is used to describe error—that is, unobserved factors that impact the dependent variable—from panel data that both changes over time and across units (individuals, firms, cities, towns, etc.)

== See also ==
- Humorism
- Allergy
- Portfolio theory
- Idiolect
