= Jan Mossin =

Norwegian economist

Jan Mossin (1936–1987) was a Norwegian economist. Born in Oslo, he graduated with a siv.øk. degree from the Norwegian School of Economics (NHH) in 1959. After a couple of years in business, he started his PhD studies in the spring semester of 1962 at Carnegie Mellon University (at that time the Carnegie Institute of Technology).

One of the papers in his doctoral dissertation was a very important contribution (1966) to the Capital Asset Pricing Model (CAPM). At Carnegie Mellon he was, among others, awarded the Alexander Henderson Award for 1968 for this contribution. If Jan Mossin had lived longer, he would most likely have been a candidate for the Nobel Prize in Economics in 1990 together with Professors William F. Sharpe and John Lintner.

After he had finished his PhD he returned to NHH where he in 1968 was tenured professor. During his time at NHH, Mossin was visiting professor at the University of California, Berkeley (1969–1970), New York University (1973–1974), Columbia University (1976), the University of Texas, Austin (1978–1979), and the University of Washington, Seattle (1983–1984). Mossin was elected fellow of the Econometric Society in 1973.

== Partial bibliography ==
=== Articles ===
- "Wages, Profits and the Dynamics of Growth", Quarterly Journal of Economics, 80, 1966, pp. 376–399.
- "Equilibrium in a Capital Asset Market", Econometrica, 34, 1966, pp. 768–783.
- "On a Class of Optimal Stock Depletion Policies", Management Science, 13, 1966, pp. 120–130.
- "The Shorter Work Week and the Labor Supply", (with Martin Bronfenbrenner) Southern Economic Journal, 33, 1967, pp. 322–331.
- "Optimal Multiperiod Portfolio Policies", Journal of Business, 41, 1968, pp. 215–229.
- "Aspects of Rational Insurance Purchasing", Journal of Political Economy, 76, 1968, pp. 553–568.
- "Taxation and Risk Taking", Economica, 36, 1968, pp. 74–82.
- "Merger Agreements: Some Game-Theoretic Considerations", Journal of Business, 41, 1968, pp. 460–471.
- "Security Pricing and Investment Criteria in Competitive Markets", American Economic Review, 59, 1969, pp. 749–756.

=== Books ===
- Theory of Financial Markets, 1973, Prentice-Hall, ISBN 0-13-913699-1
- The Economic Efficiency of Financial Markets, 1977, Lexington Books, ISBN 0-669-01004-9
