= Michael Goodkin =

American businessman (1942–2022)

Michael Goodkin (August 12, 1942 – June 6, 2022) was a quantitative finance entrepreneur and author.

== Biography ==
Goodkin was born in Chicago. He held a BA from the University of Illinois, a JD from Northwestern University and an MBA from Columbia University in 1968. Based in New York and London, he traveled extensively for the companies he founded and also to play backgammon on the international circuit. He last lived in Chicago. Goodkin died on June 6, 2022.

== Work ==
Goodkin founded his first company, Counsel's Aide, while a student at Northwestern Law School. The company provided trial lawyers with student legal research by the hour. The first of its kind in the country, it was a successful and upon graduating he sold the company.

About to graduate from Columbia University, he saw the opportunity to revolutionize trading by combining the computer with econometrics. A scholarship student with no personal wealth, in 1968 he organized venture capital from a group of private investors, recruited academic economists including Harry Markowitz, Paul Samuelson, and Robert Merton (all of whom would later win Nobel Prizes in Economics), and founded Arbitrage Management Company (AMC), an idea he had while listening to a guest lecture from Professor John Shelton of UCLA (another founder of AMC). Before graduation, he had raised $250,000 from private investors and hired professors and assistants to develop a computer program to trade Shelton's convertible arbitrage strategy. This is the first known attempt at computerized arbitrage trading. After running a successful hedge fund to prove the efficacy of computerized trading, he sold the company to a NYSE member firm and resettled in London.

His company's original investment techniques became known as statistical and quantitative arbitrage. By 1996, these techniques accounted for most of the volume on the global exchanges and the financial derivatives market. Having resettled in Chicago, Goodkin then set out to make the market less risky by introducing computational physics to derivatives risk management.

Goodkin's most successful start-up was Numerix. Recruiting a group of academic physicists, including Mitchell Feigenbaum, winner of the MacArthur grant and the Wolf Prize in Physics for his pioneering work in Chaos Theory, Numerix was founded in 1996. The company's initial product was a software algorithm that dramatically reduced the time required for Monte Carlo pricing of exotic financial derivatives and structured products. Numerix remains one of the leading software providers to financial market participants.

A lecturer at forums including the University of Chicago and the Office of the Comptroller of the Currency, Goodkin is the author of the 1981 best-selling novel, Paper Gold, and in 2012 he published his memoir The Wrong Answer Faster: The Inside Story of Making the Machine that Trades Trillions.
