= The Journal of Fixed Income =

- Discipline: Finance and investment
- Language: English
- Edited by: Stanley J. Kon

Publication details
- History: 1991-present
- Publisher: Euromoney Institutional Investor
- Frequency: Quarterly

Standard abbreviations
- ISO 4: J. Fixed Income

Indexing
- ISSN: 1059-8596
- LCCN: 91647785
- OCLC no.: 60617972

Links
- Journal homepage; Online archive

The Journal of Fixed Income is a quarterly academic journal that covers quantitative research on fixed income instruments: mortgage-backed securities, high-yield debt, municipal bonds, corporate bonds, asset-backed securities, and global bonds. Its editor-in-chief is Stanley J. Kon (Smith Breeden Associates) and its founding editor was Douglas T. Breeden (Fuqua School of Business at Duke University). It is published by Euromoney Institutional Investor.
