= Systematic risk =

Vulnerability to significant events that affect aggregate outcomes

In finance and economics, systematic risk (in economics often called aggregate risk or undiversifiable risk) is vulnerability to events which affect aggregate outcomes such as broad market returns, total economy-wide resource holdings, or aggregate income. In many contexts, events like earthquakes, epidemics and major weather catastrophes pose aggregate risks that affect not only the distribution but also the total amount of resources. That is why it is also known as contingent risk, unplanned risk or risk events. If every possible outcome of a stochastic economic process is characterized by the same aggregate result (but potentially different distributional outcomes), the process then has no aggregate risk.

== Properties ==
Systematic or aggregate risk arises from market structure or dynamics which produce shocks or uncertainty faced by all agents in the market; such shocks could arise from government policy, international economic forces, or acts of nature. In contrast, specific risk (sometimes called residual risk, unsystematic risk, or idiosyncratic risk) is risk to which only specific agents or industries are vulnerable (and is uncorrelated with broad market returns). Due to the idiosyncratic nature of unsystematic risk, it can be reduced or eliminated through diversification; but since all market actors are vulnerable to systematic risk, it cannot be limited through diversification (but it may be insurable). As a result, assets whose returns are negatively correlated with broader market returns command higher prices than assets not possessing this property.

In some cases, aggregate risk exists due to institutional or other constraints on market completeness. For countries or regions lacking access to broad hedging markets, events like earthquakes and adverse weather shocks can also act as costly aggregate risks. Robert Shiller has found that, despite the globalization progress of recent decades, country-level aggregate income risks are still significant and could potentially be reduced through the creation of better global hedging markets (thereby potentially becoming idiosyncratic, rather than aggregate, risks). Specifically, Shiller advocated for the creation of macro futures markets. The benefits of such a mechanism would depend on the degree to which macro conditions are correlated across countries.

== In finance ==
Systematic risk plays an important role in portfolio allocation. Risk which cannot be eliminated through diversification commands returns in excess of the risk-free rate (while idiosyncratic risk does not command such returns since it can be diversified). Over the long run, a well-diversified portfolio provides returns which correspond with its exposure to systematic risk; investors face a trade-off between expected returns and systematic risk. Therefore, an investor's desired returns correspond with their desired exposure to systematic risk and corresponding asset selection. Investors can only reduce a portfolio's exposure to systematic risk by sacrificing expected returns.

An important concept for evaluating an asset's exposure to systematic risk is beta. Since beta indicates the degree to which an asset's return is correlated with broader market outcomes, it is simply an indicator of an asset's vulnerability to systematic risk. Hence, the capital asset pricing model (CAPM) directly ties an asset's equilibrium price to its exposure to systematic risk.

=== A simple example ===
Consider an investor who purchases stock in many firms from most global industries. This investor is vulnerable to systematic risk but has diversified away the effects of idiosyncratic risks on his portfolio value; further reduction in risk would require him to acquire risk-free assets with lower returns (such as U.S. Treasury securities). On the other hand, an investor who invests all of his money in one industry whose returns are typically uncorrelated with broad market outcomes (beta close to zero) has limited his exposure to systematic risk but, due to lack of diversification, is highly vulnerable to idiosyncratic risk.

== In economics ==
Aggregate risk can be generated by a variety of sources. Fiscal, monetary, and regulatory policy can all be sources of aggregate risk. In some cases, shocks from phenomena like weather and natural disasters can pose aggregate risks. Small economies can also be subject to aggregate risks generated by international conditions such as terms of trade shocks.

Aggregate risk has potentially large implications for economic growth. For example, in the presence of credit rationing, aggregate risk can cause bank failures and hinder capital accumulation. Banks may respond to increases in profitability-threatening aggregate risk by raising standards for quality and quantity credit rationing to reduce monitoring costs; but the practice of lending to small numbers of borrowers reduces the diversification of bank portfolios (concentration risk) while also denying credit to some potentially productive firms or industries. As a result, capital accumulation and the overall productivity level of the economy can decline.

In economic modeling, model outcomes depend heavily on the nature of risk. Modelers often incorporate aggregate risk through shocks to endowments (budget constraints), productivity, monetary policy, or external factors like terms of trade. Idiosyncratic risks can be introduced through mechanisms like individual labor productivity shocks; if agents possess the ability to trade assets and lack borrowing constraints, the welfare effects of idiosyncratic risks are minor. The welfare costs of aggregate risk, though, can be significant.

Under some conditions, aggregate risk can arise from the aggregation of micro shocks to individual agents. This can be the case in models with many agents and strategic complementarities; situations with such characteristics include: innovation, search and trading, production in the presence of input complementarities, and information sharing. Such situations can generate aggregate data which are empirically indistinguishable from a data-generating process with aggregate shocks.

=== Example: Arrow–Debreu equilibrium ===
The following example is from Mas-Colell, Whinston, and Green (1995). Consider a simple exchange economy with two identical agents, one (divisible) good, and two potential states of the world (which occur with some probability). Each agent has expected utility in the form $\pi_1*u_i(x_{1i})+\pi_2*u_i(x_{2i})$ where $\pi_1$ and $\pi_2$ are the probabilities of states 1 and 2 occurring, respectively. In state 1, agent 1 is endowed with one unit of the good while agent 2 is endowed with nothing. In state 2, agent 2 is endowed with one unit of the good while agent 1 is endowed with nothing. That is, denoting the vector of endowments in state i as $\omega_i,$ we have $\omega_1=(1,0)$, $\omega_2=(0,1)$. Then the aggregate endowment of this economy is one good regardless of which state is realized; that is, the economy has no aggregate risk. It can be shown that, if agents are allowed to make trades, the ratio of the price of a claim on the good in state 1 to the price of a claim on the good in state 2 is equal to the ratios of their respective probabilities of occurrence (and, hence, the marginal rates of substitution of each agent are also equal to this ratio). That is, $p_1/p_2=\pi_1/\pi_2$. If allowed to do so, agents make trades such that their consumption is equal in either state of the world.

Now consider an example with aggregate risk. The economy is the same as that described above except for endowments: in state 1, agent 1 is endowed two units of the good while agent 2 still receives zero units; and in state 2, agent 2 still receives one unit of the good while agent 1 receives nothing. That is, $\omega_1=(2,0)$, $\omega_2=(0,1)$. Now, if state 1 is realized, the aggregate endowment is 2 units; but if state 2 is realized, the aggregate endowment is only 1 unit; this economy is subject to aggregate risk. Agents cannot fully insure and guarantee the same consumption in either state. It can be shown that, in this case, the price ratio will be less than the ratio of probabilities of the two states: $p_1/p_2<\pi_1/\pi_2$, so $p_1/\pi_1<p_2/\pi_2$. Thus, for example, if the two states occur with equal probabilities, then $p_1<p_2$. This is the well-known finance result that the contingent claim that delivers more resources in the state of low market returns has a higher price.

=== In heterogeneous agent models ===
While the inclusion of aggregate risk is common in macroeconomic models, considerable challenges arise when researchers attempt to incorporate aggregate uncertainty into models with heterogeneous agents. In this case, the entire distribution of allocational outcomes is a state variable which must be carried across periods. This gives rise to the well-known curse of dimensionality. One approach to the dilemma is to let agents ignore attributes of the aggregate distribution, justifying this assumption by referring to bounded rationality. Den Haan (2010) evaluates several algorithms which have been applied to solving the Krusell and Smith (1998) model, showing that solution accuracy can depend heavily on solution method. Researchers should carefully consider the results of accuracy tests while choosing solution methods and pay particular attention to grid selection.

== In projects ==
Systematic risk exists in projects and is called the overall project risk bred by the combined effect of uncertainty in external environmental factors such as PESTLE, VUCA, etc. It is also called contingent or unplanned risk or simply uncertainty because it is of unknown likelihood and unknown impact. In contrast, systemic risk is known as the individual project risk, caused by internal factors or attributes of the project system or culture. This is also known as inherent, planned, event or condition risk caused by known unknowns such as variability or ambiguity of impact but 100% probability of occurrence. Both systemic and systematic risks are residual risk.

== Measurement in asset pricing ==
In asset pricing, systematic risk is commonly measured by beta, which estimates how sensitive an asset's return is to movements in a market portfolio or benchmark. Beta is commonly expressed as the covariance between the return on the asset and the return on the market, divided by the variance of the market return:

$$\beta_i = \frac{\operatorname{Cov}(R_i, R_m)}{\operatorname{Var}(R_m)}$$

A beta of 1 indicates that the asset tends to move with the market benchmark, while a beta above or below 1 indicates greater or lower sensitivity to market movements. In the capital asset pricing model, the expected return on an asset is linked to beta risk rather than to diversifiable, nonsystematic risk.

== See also ==
- Modern portfolio theory
- Capital asset pricing model
- Risk modeling
- Taleb distribution
