= Treynor dealer model =

Economical model

The Treynor dealer model, developed by Jack L. Treynor in a 1987 CFA Institute publication "The Economics of the Dealer Function" describes the role of the broker-dealer in providing market liquidity through exchanges with a value-based transactor (VBT) for securities.

According to Treynor, both VBTs and security dealers can provide market liquidity while profiting from a bid–ask spread, but a VBT's value-based pricing spread, the ‘outside spread’ is much larger than the dealer's, ‘inside spread’ owing to differences in the two market makers’ motivations and risk tolerances due to disparities in available capital and desired length of time to hold a security.

== Model structure ==
Security dealers choose the degree of price and liquidity risk to bear, their price risk is evidenced by their price quotes, meanwhile, their liquidity risk comes in the form of their yield quotes. Dealers find themselves constrained by their quantity of cash and the securities available to them in the market. Dealers will choose a short position when they can sell borrowed securities priced above their anticipated, fundamental value. Dealers profit from such short position transactions if the price for the security borrowed falls at the time they must return the security to its owner. Conversely, dealers elect long positions, taking on positive inventories of securities as assets, to compensate for liquidity risks. If dealers believe the fundamental price for a security to be lower than the future price, the dealer will buy low and sell high. Crucially for the money markets, dealers can be thought of as borrowing short term and lending long term, motivated by liquidity. VBTs, by contrast, are the bargain hunters in the market for securities, they search for differences in prices and intrinsic values, therefore, motivated by a price quote and in no hurry to transact.

Accordingly, to Treynor, the absence of a dealer leaves those in the market for securities in a bind where they need to motivate the VBT to trade at prices exceeding 15-20% of the security's value. Because the arrivals of sellers and buyers to a transaction are often random, the dealer's presence serves to bring hurried sellers and buyers together at a lower spread, bringing the dealer's price closer to the equilibrium price for a security.

The dealer's position is built up after a long run of either sellers or buyers, the volatility of the money market for particular securities and the level of inventories the dealer possesses. Dealers’ positions are set, limited to long or short, when a limit is reached, the dealer will lay off (dealer accepts a bid price below his/her own bid price) to a VBT or buy in (dealer pays an ask price above his/her own ask price). Laying off to a VBT is thus considered laying off to the "market-maker of last resort".

Accordingly, for the dealer, the cost of laying-off, a loss to the dealer, is the dealer's primary variable cost and is built into the dealer's spread. The range of the dealer's price, therefore, according to Treynor's conclusions, can be anywhere between 30 and 40% of the security's value all without any valuation changes from the VBT to compensate for the cost of laying-off.

Treynor's dealer model also accounts for the arrival of new information. Since new information is implanted in the price, bid and ask, of securities and the two market makers prices are said to be linked, both spreads will adjust for additional information. According to Treynor, any insider trading law against acting on such new information must protect dealers and investor confidence to sustain liquidity in the market.
