= Consumption-based capital asset pricing model =

Return on investment metrics

The consumption-based capital asset pricing model (CCAPM) is a model of the determination of expected (i.e. required) return on an investment, both across assets and over time. The foundations of this concept were laid by the research of Robert Lucas (1978) and Douglas Breeden (1979).

The model can be considered a generalization of the capital asset pricing model (CAPM). While the CAPM is derived in a static, one-period setting, the CCAPM uses a more realistic, multiple-period setup. The central implication of the CCAPM is that the expected return on an asset is related to "consumption risk", that is, how much the return on the asset correlates with aggregate consumption in the economy. Assets whose returns covaries a lot with aggregate consumption offer large expected returns, as investors want to be compensated for bearing consumption risk.

The CAPM can be derived from the following special cases of the CCAPM: (1) a two-period model with quadratic utility, (2) two-periods, exponential utility, and normally-distributed returns, (3) infinite-periods, quadratic utility, and stochastic independence across time, (4) infinite periods and log utility, and (5) a first-order approximation of a general model with normal distributions.

In financial economics, the CCAPM is usually stated as follows: the expected risk premium on a risky asset, defined as the expected return on a risky asset less the risk free return, is proportional to the covariance of its return and consumption in the period of the return. The consumption beta is included, and the expected return is calculated as follows:

$E[r_i]-r^f=\beta(r^m-r^f)$

where

$E[r_i]$ = expected return on security or portfolio
$r^f$ = risk free rate
$\beta$ = consumption beta (of individual company or weighted average of portfolio), and
$r^m$ = return from the market

In macroeconomics, the CCAPM is stated directly in terms of the first-order conditions for optimal dynamic consumption and saving of the representative agent in the economy. These first-order conditions are usually referred to as "stochastic Euler equations."
