= Harry Markowitz =

American economist and Nobel Laureate (1927–2023)

- Born: Harry Max Markowitz; August 24, 1927; Chicago, Illinois, U.S.
- Died: June 22, 2023 (aged 95); San Diego, California, U.S.

Academic background
- Education: University of Chicago (PhB, MA, PhD)
- Doctoral advisor: Milton Friedman; Jacob Marschak
- Influences: Tjalling Koopmans; Leonard Savage

Academic work
- Discipline: Financial economics
- School or tradition: Chicago School of Economics
- Institutions: Harry Markowitz Company; Rady School of Management at the University of California, San Diego; Baruch College; RAND Corporation; Cowles Commission; University of Pennsylvania
- Notable ideas: Modern portfolio theory Efficient frontier Sparse matrix methods SIMSCRIPT
- Awards: John von Neumann Theory Prize (1989); Nobel Memorial Prize in Economic Sciences (1990)
- Website: Information at IDEAS / RePEc

Harry Max Markowitz (August 24, 1927 – June 22, 2023) was an American economist who received the 1989 John von Neumann Theory Prize and the 1990 Nobel Memorial Prize in Economic Sciences.

Markowitz was a professor of finance at the Rady School of Management at the University of California, San Diego (UCSD). He is best known for his work in modern portfolio theory, studying the effects of asset risk, return, correlation and diversification on probable investment portfolio returns.

== Biography ==
Harry Markowitz was born to a Jewish family, the son of Morris and Mildred Markowitz. During high school, Markowitz developed an interest in physics and philosophy, in particular the ideas of David Hume, an interest he continued to follow during his undergraduate years at the University of Chicago. After receiving his Ph.B. in Liberal Arts, Markowitz decided to continue his studies at the University of Chicago, choosing to specialize in economics. There he had the opportunity to study under important economists, including Milton Friedman, Tjalling Koopmans, Jacob Marschak and Leonard Savage. While still a student, he was invited to become a member of the Cowles Commission for Research in Economics, which was in Chicago at the time. He completed his A.M. in Economics from the university in 1950.

Markowitz chose to apply mathematics to the analysis of the stock market as the topic for his dissertation. Jacob Marschak, who was the thesis advisor, encouraged him to pursue the topic, noting that it had also been a favorite interest of Alfred Cowles, the founder of the Cowles Commission. While researching the then current understanding of stock prices, which at the time consisted in the present value model of John Burr Williams, Markowitz realized that the theory lacks an analysis of the impact of risk. This insight led to the development of his seminal theory of portfolio allocation under uncertainty, published in 1952 by the Journal of Finance.

In 1952, Harry Markowitz went to work for the RAND Corporation, where he met George Dantzig. With Dantzig's help, Markowitz continued to research optimization techniques, further developing the critical line algorithm for the identification of the optimal mean-variance portfolios, relying on what was later named the Markowitz frontier. It was also in 1952 that Markowitz published Portfolio Selection, his first paper dissecting investment portfolio strategy.

In 1954, he received a PhD in economics from the University of Chicago with a thesis on the portfolio theory. The topic was so novel that, while Markowitz was defending his dissertation, Milton Friedman argued his contribution was not economics. During 1955–1956 Markowitz spent a year at the Cowles Foundation, which had moved to Yale University, at the invitation of James Tobin. He published the critical line algorithm in a 1956 paper and used this time at the foundation to write a book on portfolio allocation which was published in 1959.

Markowitz won the Nobel Memorial Prize in Economic Sciences in 1990 while a professor of finance at Baruch College of the City University of New York. In the preceding year, he received the John von Neumann Theory Prize from the Operations Research Society of America (now Institute for Operations Research and the Management Sciences, INFORMS) for his contributions in the theory of three fields: portfolio theory; sparse matrix methods; and simulation language programming (SIMSCRIPT). Sparse matrix methods are now widely used to solve very large systems of simultaneous equations whose coefficients are mostly zero. SIMSCRIPT has been widely used to program computer simulations of manufacturing, transportation, and computer systems as well as war games. SIMSCRIPT (I) included the Buddy memory allocation method, which was also developed by Markowitz. He was elected to the 2002 class of Fellows of the Institute for Operations Research and the Management Sciences.

=== CACI ===
The company that would become CACI International was founded by Herb Karr and Harry Markowitz on July 17, 1962, as California Analysis Center, Inc. They helped develop SIMSCRIPT, the first simulation programming language, at RAND and after it was released to the public domain, CACI was founded to provide support and training for SIMSCRIPT.

In 1968, Markowitz joined Arbitrage Management company founded by Michael Goodkin. Working with Paul Samuelson and Robert Merton he created a hedge fund that represents one of the first known attempts at computerized arbitrage trading. He took over as chief executive in 1970. After a successful run as a private hedge fund, AMC was sold to Stuart & Co. in 1971. A year later, Markowitz left the company.

Years later, he was involved with CACI's SIMSCRIPT addition of Object-oriented features.

=== Post-CACI ===
Markowitz divided his time between teaching (he was an adjunct professor at the Rady School of Management at the University of California at San Diego, UCSD); video casting lectures; and consulting (out of his Harry Markowitz Company offices). He served on the advisory board of SkyView Investment Advisors, a traditional and alternative investment advisory firm. Markowitz also served on the Investment Committee of LWI Financial Inc. ("Loring Ward"), a San Jose, California-based investment advisor; on the advisory panel of Robert D. Arnott's Newport Beach, California based investment management firm, Research Affiliates; on the advisory board of Mark T. Hebner's Irvine, California and internet based wealth management and taxes firm, Index Fund Advisors; and as an advisor to the Investment Committee of 1st Global, a Dallas, Texas-based wealth management and investment advisory firm. Markowitz advised and served on the board of ProbabilityManagement.org, a 501(c)(3) non-profit that aims "to reshape the communication and calculation of uncertainty."

Markowitz was co-founder and Chief Architect of GuidedChoice, a 401(k) managed accounts provider and investment advisor. Markowitz's more recent work included designing the backbone software analytics for the GuidedChoice investment solution and heading the GuidedChoice Investment Committee. He was actively involved in designing the next step in the retirement process: assisting retirees with wealth distribution through GuidedSpending.

In 2018 Markowitz donated his Nobel Prize medal and diploma to the Geisel Library of the University of California, San Diego due to his "love for the campus and the joy he [got] out of teaching" at the Rady School of Management. He died on June 22, 2023, at the age of 95. He died in a hospital in San Diego, California due to complications from pneumonia and sepsis.

== Research ==
A Markowitz-efficient portfolio is one where diversification cannot lower the portfolio's risk for a given return expectation (alternately, no additional expected return can be gained without increasing the risk of the portfolio). The Markowitz Efficient Frontier is the set of all portfolios that will give the highest expected return for each given level of risk. These concepts of efficiency were essential to the development of the capital asset pricing model.

Markowitz also co-edited the textbook The Theory and Practice of Investment Management with Frank J. Fabozzi of Yale School of Management. In the same line, Markowitz was part of the editorial board of AESTIMATIO, the IEB International Journal of Finance.

== Selected publications ==
- Markowitz, H.M. (March 1952). "Portfolio Selection". The Journal of Finance. 7 (1): 77–91. doi:10.2307/2975974. JSTOR 2975974.
- Markowitz, H.M. (April 1952). "The Utility of Wealth" (PDF). The Journal of Political Economy. LX (2): 151–158. doi:10.1086/257177. S2CID 154195524.
- Markowitz, H.M. (April 1957). "The Elimination Form of the Inverse and Its Application to Linear Programming". Management Science. 3 (3): 255–269. doi:10.1287/mnsc.3.3.255. Archived from the original on September 24, 2017.
- Markowitz, H.M. (1959). Portfolio Selection: Efficient Diversification of Investments. New York: John Wiley & Sons. (reprinted by Yale University Press, 1970, ISBN 978-0300013726; 2nd ed. Basil Blackwell, 1991, ISBN 978-1557861085)
- Markowitz, H.M. (October 1, 1979). Belzer, Jack; Holzman, Albert G.; Kent, Allen (eds.). "SIMSCRIPT", Encyclopedia of Computer Science and Technology. Vol. 13. New York and Basel: Marcel Dekker. p. 516. ISBN 978-0824722630.
- Markowitz, H.M. and E. van Dijk (March–April 2003). "Single-Period Mean-Variance Analysis in a Changing World". Financial Analysts Journal. 59 (2): 30–44. doi:10.2469/faj.v59.n2.2512. S2CID 218507861.
- Markowitz, H.M. (September–October 2005). "Market Efficiency: A Theoretical Distinction and So What?" (PDF). Financial Analysts Journal. 61 (5): 17–30. doi:10.2469/faj.v61.n5.2752. S2CID 33674241.
- Markowitz, H.M. (2009). Harry Markowitz: Selected Works. World Scientific-Nobel Laureate Series: Vol. 1. Hackensack, New Jersey: World Scientific. p. 716. ISBN 978-9812833648. Archived from the original on February 23, 2011.

== See also ==
- List of economists
- List of Jewish Nobel laureates
- Risk management tools

Awards
Preceded by Trygve Haavelmo	Laureate of the Nobel Memorial Prize in Economics; 1990; Served alongside: Merton H. Miller, William F. Sharpe	Succeeded by Ronald H. Coase
