= QUIKSCRIPT =

Simulation language

QUIKSCRIPT is a simulation language derived from SIMSCRIPT, based on 20-GATE. It is a programming language for the 1960s Bendix G-20 computer.
