= SIMSCRIPT =

Simulation language

SIMSCRIPT is a free-form, English-like general-purpose simulation language conceived by Harry Markowitz and Bernard Hausner at the RAND Corporation in 1962. It was implemented as a Fortran preprocessor on the IBM 7090 and was designed for large discrete event simulations. It influenced Simula.

Though earlier versions were released into the public domain, SIMSCRIPT was commercialized by Markowitz's company, California Analysis Center, Inc. (CACI), which produced proprietary versions SIMSCRIPT I.5 and SIMSCRIPT II.5.

== SIMSCRIPT II.5 ==
SIMSCRIPT II.5 was the last pre-PC incarnation of SIMSCRIPT, one of the oldest computer simulation languages. Although military contractor CACI released it in 1971, it still enjoys wide use in large-scale military and air-traffic control simulations.

SIMSCRIPT II.5 is a powerful, free-form, English-like, general-purpose simulation programming language. It supports the application of software engineering principles, such as structured programming and modularity, which impart orderliness and manageability to simulation models.

== SIMSCRIPT III ==
SIMSCRIPT III Release 4.0 was available by 2009, and by then it ran on Windows 7, SUN OS and Linux and has object-oriented features.

By 1997, SIMSCRIPT III already had a GUI interface to its compiler. The latest version is Release 5; earlier versions already supported 64-bit processing.

== PL/I implementation ==
A PL/I implementation was developed during 1968–1969, based on the public domain version released by RAND Corporation.

== See also ==
- QUIKSCRIPT
- GPSS
