= John Lintner =

American economist (1916–1983)

John Virgil Lintner Jr. (February 9, 1916 – June 8, 1983) was a professor at the Harvard Business School in the 1960s and one of the co-creators of the capital asset pricing model.

For a time, much confusion was created because the various economists working on this model independently failed to realize that they were saying much the same thing. They looked at the issue of capital asset valuation from different perspectives. William F. Sharpe, for example, approached the problem as an individual investor picking stocks. Lintner, on the other hand, approached it from the perspective of a corporation issuing shares of stock.

Lintner was also known for a 1983 presentation he gave to the Financial Analysts Federation. For the first time he presented what has become known as the "Lintner Paper," formally titled "The Potential Role of Managed Commodity-Financial Futures Accounts (and/or Funds) in Portfolios of Stocks and Bonds." Lintner's research combined a volatile asset, managed futures CTAs, with another volatile asset, stocks, to reduce overall portfolio volatility and improve returns. For NonCorrelated investors Lintner's work was a foundational milestone that has been used to advance this investment discipline.

Lintner earned his bachelor's degree from the University of Kansas in 1939. He arrived at Harvard for graduate study the next year. He quickly impressed the faculty, and in 1942 became a member of the Society of Fellows, a three-year paid fellowship with no duties except self-directed research.

== Personal life ==
John Lintner was born to John Virgil and Pearl Lintner in Lone Elm, KS on February 9, 1916. From his first marriage to Sylvia Chace, he had two children, John Howland and Nancy Chace. From his second marriage to Eleanor Hodges, he had a stepson, Allan Hodges. Lintner died of a heart attack while driving on June 8, 1983, in Cambridge, MA.

== Education ==
He received an A.B., in 1939 and a M.A., in 1940 from the University of Kansas; a M.A., in 1942; and Ph.D., in 1946 from Harvard University.

== Positions ==
- 1939-40 - Instructor, Business Administration, University of Kansas, Lawrence
- 1941 - Member of Research Staff on fiscal policy, National Bureau of Economic Research, New York
- 1946-51 - Assistant Professor, Harvard University, Graduate School of Business Administration
- 1951-56 - Associate Professor, Harvard University, Graduate School of Business Administration
- 1956-64 - Professor of Business Administration, Harvard University
- 1964-83 - George Gund Professor of Economics and Business Administration, Harvard University
- 1950-83 - Member of Board of trustees, Cambridge Savings Bank
- 1975-83 - Board of director, US & Foreign securities corp, Chase of Boston Mutual Funds
- Consultant to business & government

== Lintner's dividend policy model ==
Lintner's dividend policy model is a model theorizing how a publicly traded company sets its dividend policy. The logic is that every company wants to maintain a constant rate of dividend even if the results in a particular period are not up to the mark. The assumption is that investors will prefer to receive a certain dividend payout.

The model states that dividends are paid according to two factors. The first is the net present value of earnings, with higher values indicating higher dividends. The second is the sustainability of earnings; that is, a company may increase its earnings without increasing its dividend payouts until managers are convinced that it will continue to maintain such earnings. The theory was adopted based on observations that many companies will set their long-run target dividends-to-earnings ratios based upon the amount of positive net-present-value projects that they have available.

The model then uses two parameters, the target payout ratio and the speed where current dividends adjust to that target:

  
  
    
      
        
          
            
              
                
                  D
                  
                    t
                  
                
              
              
                
                =
                
                  D
                  
                    t
                    −
                    1
                  
                
                +
                ρ
                ⋅
                
                  (
                  
                    
                      D
                      
                        t
                      
                      
                        ∗
                      
                    
                    −
                    
                      D
                      
                        t
                        −
                        1
                      
                    
                  
                  )
                
              
            
            
              
              
                
                =
                
                  D
                  
                    t
                    −
                    1
                  
                
                +
                ρ
                ⋅
                
                  (
                  
                    τ
                    ⋅
                    
                      E
                      
                        t
                      
                    
                    −
                    
                      D
                      
                        t
                        −
                        1
                      
                    
                  
                  )
                
              
            
            
              
              
                
                =
                ρ
                ⋅
                τ
                ⋅
                
                  E
                  
                    t
                  
                
                +
                (
                1
                −
                ρ
                )
                ⋅
                
                  D
                  
                    t
                    −
                    1
                  
                
              
            
            
              
              
                
                =
                ρ
                ⋅
                
                  D
                  
                    t
                  
                  
                    ∗
                  
                
                +
                (
                1
                −
                ρ
                )
                ⋅
                
                  D
                  
                    t
                    −
                    1
                  
                
              
            
          
        
      
    
    {\displaystyle {\begin{aligned}D_{t}&=D_{t-1}+\rho \cdot \left(D_{t}^{*}-D_{t-1}\right)\\&=D_{t-1}+\rho \cdot \left(\tau \cdot E_{t}-D_{t-1}\right)\\&=\rho \cdot \tau \cdot E_{t}+(1-\rho )\cdot D_{t-1}\\&=\rho \cdot D_{t}^{*}+(1-\rho )\cdot D_{t-1}\end{aligned}}}
  

where:

- $D_{t}$ is the dividend per share at time $t$
- $D_{t-1}$ is the dividend per share at time $(t-1)$, i.e. last year's dividend per share
- $\rho$ is the speed of adjustment rate or the partial adjustment coefficient, with $0 \leq \rho \leq 1$
- $D_{t}^{*}$ is the target dividend per share at time $t$, with $D_{t}^{*} = \tau \cdot E_{t}$
- $\tau$ is the target payout ratio on earnings per share (or on free-cash-flow per share), with $0 \leq \tau \leq 1$
- $E_{t}$ is the earnings per share (or free-cash-flow per share) at time $t$

When applying its model to U.S. stocks, Lintner found $\rho \simeq 30%$ and $\tau \simeq 50%$.

== Bibliography ==
- Effect of federal taxes on growing enterprises, J. Keith Butters and John Lintner, 1945, Division of Research, Graduate School of Business Administration, Harvard University
- Mutual Savings Banks in the Savings and Mortgage Markets, John Lintner, Jan 1, 1948, Harvard university
- Corporate profits in perspective (National Economic Problems), John Lintner, 1949, American Enterprise Assn.
- Effects of taxation: Corporate Mergers, J. Keith Butters, John Lintner, William Lucius Carey, 1952, Division of Research, Harvard University
- The Valuation of Risk Assets and the Selection of Risky Investments in Stock Portfolios and Capital Budgets, John Lintner, 1965, Review of Economics and Statistics. 47:1, pp. 13–37.
- Allowance of rates of return on public utility equities: The double leverage controversy, John Lintner, 1980, Working paper - Division of Research, Graduate School of Business Admin, Harvard University, HBS 80-32
- Allowance of rates of return on public utility equities: The theory of optimal rate of return regulation of utilities and the double leverage controversy, John Lintner, 1981, Harvard University
- The potential role of managed commodity financial futures accounts and or funds in portfolios of stocks and bonds, John Lintner, 1983, Working paper, Harvard University
- Some new perspectives on tests of CAPM and other capital asset pricing models and issues of market efficiency, John Lintner, 1981, Harvard Institute of Economic Research discussion paper

== Archives and records ==
- John V. Lintner papers at Baker Library Special Collections, Harvard Business School.
