= Robert C. Merton =

American economist and Nobel Laureate (born 1944)

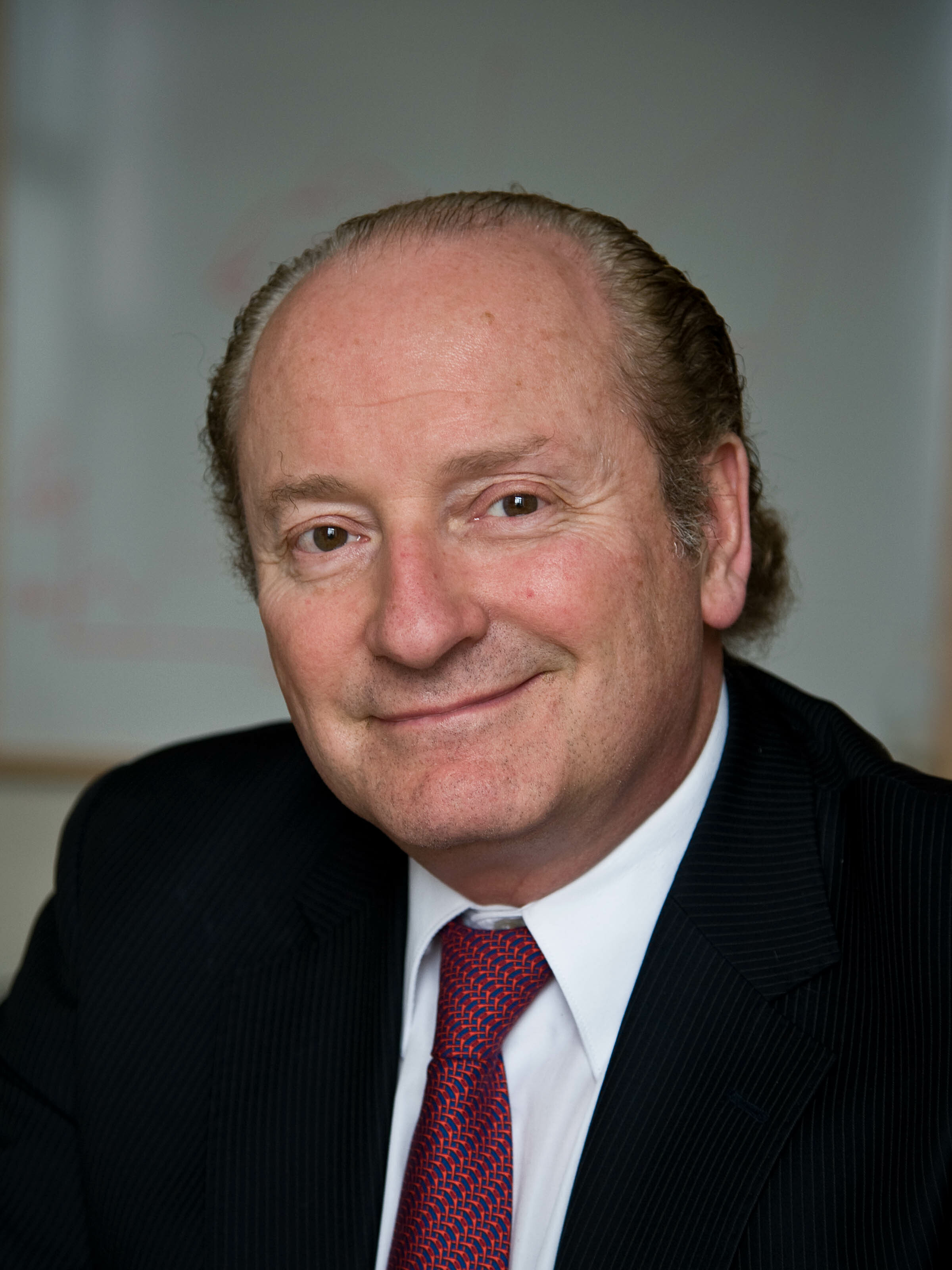
- Merton in 2010
- Born: Robert Cox Merton; July 31, 1944 (age 82); New York City, New York, U.S.
- Education: Columbia University; California Institute of Technology; Massachusetts Institute of Technology
- Known for: Black–Scholes–Merton model ICAPM; Merton's portfolio problem Merton model Fractional Finance; Long-Term Capital Management
- Father: Robert K. Merton
- Awards: Nobel Memorial Prize in Economic Sciences (1997)
- Scientific career
- Fields: Finance, economics
- Workplaces: Massachusetts Institute of Technology Harvard University
- Doctoral advisor: Paul Samuelson
- Doctoral students: Jonathan E. Ingersoll; Robert Jarrow

Robert Cox Merton (born July 31, 1944) is an American economist, Nobel Memorial Prize in Economic Sciences laureate, and professor at the MIT Sloan School of Management. He is best known for his pioneering contributions to continuous-time finance, particularly the first continuous-time option pricing model, the Black–Scholes–Merton model.

In 1997, Merton and Myron Scholes were jointly awarded the Bank of Sweden Prize in Economic Sciences in Memory of Alfred Nobel for developing a method to determine the value of derivative securities.

Merton was on the board of directors of Long-Term Capital Management (LTCM), a highly leveraged hedge fund that collapsed in 1998, wiping out most of the value paid in by the investors, and requiring a $3.6 billion bailout from a group of 14 banks, in a deal brokered and put together by the Federal Reserve Bank of New York.

Merton's current research focus is on the topics of lifecycle investing and retirement funding, measuring and monitoring systemic risks in microfinance, and financial innovation coupled with changing dynamics in financial institutions.

== Early life and education ==
Merton was born in New York City to sociologist Robert K. Merton and Suzanne Carhart, who was from a "multigenerational southern New Jersey Methodist/Quaker family." He grew up in Hastings-on-Hudson, New York.

Merton earned a B.S. in engineering mathematics from the School of Engineering and Applied Science of Columbia University, an M.S. from the California Institute of Technology, and his Ph.D. in economics from the Massachusetts Institute of Technology in 1970 under the guidance of Paul Samuelson.

== Career ==
In 1970, Merton joined the faculty of the MIT Sloan School of Management, where he taught until 1988. Subsequently, Merton moved to Harvard University, where he was George Fisher Baker Professor of Business Administration from 1988 to 1998. He was the John and Natty McArthur University Professor from 1998 to 2010, becoming professor emeritus at Harvard University in 2010.

In 2010 Robert C. Merton rejoined the MIT Sloan School of Management where he is the School of Management Distinguished Professor of Finance. Since 2010, he has also been a Resident Scientist at Dimensional Fund Advisors, working on pension management.

Merton received the Alfred Nobel Memorial Prize in Economic Sciences in 1997 for a new methodology to value derivatives. He is past President of the American Finance Association (1986), a member of the National Academy of Sciences (1993), and a fellow of the American Academy of Arts and Sciences.

He remained on the faculty at MIT in 2021.

== Research ==
Merton's research focuses on finance theory, including lifecycle finance, optimal intertemporal portfolio selection, capital asset pricing, pricing of options, risky corporate debt, loan guarantees, and other complex derivative securities. He has also written on the operation and regulation of financial institutions. Merton's current academic interests include financial innovation and dynamics of institutional change, controlling the propagation of macro financial risk, and improving methods of measuring and managing sovereign risk. He is the author of Continuous-Time Finance, and a co-author of Cases in Financial Engineering: Applied Studies of Financial Innovation and The Global Financial System: A Functional Perspective; Finance; and Financial Economics. Merton was a founding co-editor of the Annual Review of Financial Economics, serving from 2009 to 2021.

Merton has also been recognized for translating finance science into practice. He received the inaugural Financial Engineer of the Year Award from the International Association of Financial Engineers in 1993, which also elected him a senior fellow. Derivatives Strategy magazine named him to its Derivatives Hall of Fame in 1998 as did Risk magazine to its Risk Hall of Fame in 2002. He also received Risk's Lifetime Achievement Award for contributions to the field of risk management in 2003. A distinguished fellow of the Institute for Quantitative Research in Finance ('Q Group', 1997) and a fellow of the Financial Management Association (2000), Merton received the Nicholas Molodovsky Award for Outstanding Contribution to Investment Research from the CFA Institute (2003).

His first professional association with a hedge fund came in 1968. His advisor at the time, Paul Samuelson, brought him on board the Arbitrage Management Company (AMC), to join the founder, Michael Goodkin, and chief executive, Harry Markowitz. AMC is the first known attempt at computerized arbitrage trading. After a successful run as a private hedge fund, AMC was sold to Stuart & Co. in 1971. In 1993, Merton co-founded a hedge fund, Long-Term Capital Management, which earned high returns for four years but later lost $4.6 billion in 1998 and was bailed out by a consortium of banks and closed out in early 2000.

== Black-Scholes-Merton Model ==
One of Robert C. Merton's most important contributions to economics and finance was his development of the Black-Scholes-Merton option pricing model. Building on work by Fischer Black and Myron Scholes, Merton independently developed a continuous-time framework for valuing financial derivatives and expanded the model to a broader range of financial applications. His research demonstrated how a portfolio could be constructed to replicate the payoff of an option, allowing the option's value to be determines mathematically rather than through subjective estimates of risk.

The model became a foundation of modern financial economics and transformed the way investors, corporations, and financial institutions manage risk. Its methods have been applied to stock options, corporate securities, mortgages, and other financial contracts. The framework also helped establish derivative pricing as a major field of academic research and professional practice.

For his contributions to the theory of derivative valuation, Merton and Myron Scholes received the Sveriges Riksbank Prize in Economic Sciences in Memory of Alfred Nobel in 1997. The Nobel Committee recognized their work for providing a new method to determine the value of derivatives, one that has had a lasting influence on global financial markets.

== Personal life ==
Merton married June Rose in 1966. They separated in 1996. They have three children: two sons and one daughter.

== Honours and awards ==
- In 1986, Merton became a Fellow at the American Academy of Arts and Sciences.
- In 1986, Merton was President of the American Finance Association.
- In 1993, Merton became a member of the U.S. United States National Academy of Sciences.
- In 1993, Merton was awarded the International INA – Accademia Nazionale dei Lincei Prize, National Academy of Lincei, Rome.
- In 1993, Merton won the inaugural Financial Engineer of the Year Award by the International Association of Financial Engineers (since renamed International Association for Quantitative Finance).
- In 1994, Merton became a Senior Fellow at the International Association of Financial Engineers (since renamed International Association for Quantitative Finance)
- In 1997, Merton became a Distinguished Fellow at the Institute for Quantitative Research in Finance ('Q Group').
- In 1997, Merton was awarded the Nobel Memorial Prize in Economic Sciences with Myron Scholes for their work on stock options.
- In 1998, Merton was awarded the Michael I. Pupin Medal for Service to the Nation from Columbia University.
- In 1999, Merton was awarded a lifetime achievement award in mathematical finance.
- In 2000, Merton became a FMA Fellow at the Financial Management Association.
- In 2000, Merton became a Fellow at the Society of Fellows, American Finance Association.
- In 2003, Merton received the Nicholas Molodovsky Award for Outstanding Contribution to Investment Research from the CFA Institute.
- In 2005, the Baker Library at Harvard University opened The Merton Exhibit in his honor.
- In 2009, Merton was awarded the Robert A. Muh Award in the Humanities, Arts, and Social Sciences from Massachusetts Institute of Technology.
- In 2009, Merton was awarded the Tjalling C. Koopmans Asset Award from Tilburg University.
- In 2010, Merton received the Kolmogorov medal from the University of London.
- In 2010, Merton received the Hamilton Medal from the Royal Irish Academy.
- In 2011, Merton received the CME Group Melamed-Arditti Innovation Award.
- In 2013, Merton received the WFE Award for Excellence from the World Federation of Exchanges.
- In 2014, Merton received the Lifetime Achievement Award from the Financial Intermediation Research Society.
- In 2017, Merton received the Finance Diamond Price from the Fundacion de Investigacion IMEF, Mexico.
- In 2021, Merton received the James R. Killian Jr. Faculty Achievement Award from the Massachusetts Institute of Technology. ￼
- In 2021, Merton was inducted into the Fixed Income Analysts Society Hall of Fame.
- In 2021, Merton received Risk magazine's Lifetime Achievement Award for contributions to the field of risk management.
- In 2022, Merton received a Lifetime Achievement Award from the Plan Sponsor Council of America (PSCA).

== Publications ==
- Theory of rational option pricing (1973)

== See also ==
- List of economists
- List of quantitative analysts
- List of Jewish Nobel laureates

Awards
Preceded by James A. Mirrlees; William Vickrey	Laureate of the Nobel Memorial Prize in Economics; 1997; Served alongside: Myron S. Scholes	Succeeded by Amartya Sen
