= Intertemporal CAPM =

In mathematical finance, the intertemporal capital asset pricing model (ICAPM) created by Robert C. Merton, is an alternative to the capital asset pricing model (CAPM). It is a linear factor model with wealth as state variable that forecasts changes in the distribution of future returns or income.

In the ICAPM investors are solving lifetime consumption decisions when faced with more than one uncertainty. The main difference between ICAPM and standard CAPM is the additional state variables that acknowledge the fact that investors hedge against shortfalls in consumption or against changes in the future investment opportunity set.

== Continuous time version ==
Merton considers a continuous time market in equilibrium. The state variable (X) follows a Brownian motion:

$$dX = \mu dt + s dZ$$

The investor maximizes his Von Neumann–Morgenstern utility:

$$E_o \left\{\int_o^T U[C(t),t]dt + B[W(T),T] \right\}$$

where T is the time horizon and B[W(T),T] the utility from wealth (W).

The investor has the following constraint on wealth (W). Let $w_i$ be the weight invested in the asset i. Then:

$$W(t+dt) = [W(t) -C(t) dt]\sum_{i=0}^n w_i[1+ r_i(t+ dt)]$$

where $r_i$ is the return on asset i. The change in wealth is:

$$dW=-C(t)dt +[W(t)-C(t)dt]\sum w_i(t)r_i(t+dt)$$

We can use dynamic programming to solve the problem. For instance, if we consider a series of discrete time problems:

$$\max E_0 \left\{\sum_{t=0}^{T-dt}\int_t^{t+dt} U[C(s),s]ds + B[W(T),T] \right\}$$

Then, a Taylor expansion gives:

$$\int_t^{t+dt}U[C(s),s]ds= U[C(t),t]dt + \frac{1}{2} U_t [C(t^*),t^*]dt^2 \approx U[C(t),t]dt$$

where $t^*$ is a value between t and t+dt.

Assuming that returns follow a Brownian motion:

$$r_i(t+dt) = \alpha_i dt + \sigma_i dz_i$$

with:

$$E(r_i) = \alpha_i dt \quad ;\quad E(r_i^2)=var(r_i)=\sigma_i^2dt \quad ;\quad cov(r_i,r_j) = \sigma_{ij}dt$$

Then canceling out terms of second and higher order:

$$dW \approx [W(t) \sum w_i \alpha_i - C(t)]dt+W(t) \sum w_i \sigma_i dz_i$$

Using Bellman equation, we can restate the problem:

$$J(W,X,t) = max \; E_t\left\{\int_t^{t+dt} U[C(s),s]ds + J[W(t+dt),X(t+dt),t+dt]\right\}$$

subject to the wealth constraint previously stated.

Using Ito's lemma we can rewrite:

$$dJ = J[W(t+dt),X(t+dt),t+dt]-J[W(t),X(t),t+dt]= J_t dt + J_W dW + J_X dX + \frac{1}{2}J_{XX} dX^2 + \frac{1}{2}J_{WW} dW^2 + J_{WX} dX dW$$

and the expected value:

$$E_t J[W(t+dt),X(t+dt),t+dt]=J[W(t),X(t),t]+J_t dt + J_W E[dW]+ J_X E(dX) + \frac{1}{2} J_{XX} var(dX)+\frac{1}{2} J_{WW} var[dW] + J_{WX} cov(dX,dW)$$

After some algebra , we have the following objective function:

$$max \left\{ U(C,t) + J_t + J_W W [\sum_{i=1}^n w_i(\alpha_i-r_f)+r_f] - J_WC + \frac{W^2}{2} J_{WW}\sum_{i=1}^n\sum_{j=1}^n w_i w_j \sigma_{ij} + J_X \mu + \frac{1}{2}J_{XX} s^2 + J_{WX} W \sum_{i=1}^n w_i \sigma_{iX} \right\}$$

where $r_f$ is the risk-free return. First order conditions are:

$$J_W(\alpha_i-r_f)+J_{WW}W \sum_{j=1}^n w^*_j \sigma_{ij} + J_{WX} \sigma_{iX}=0 \quad i=1,2,\ldots,n$$

In matrix form, we have:

$$(\alpha - r_f {\mathbf 1}) = \frac{-J_{WW}}{J_W} \Omega w^* W + \frac{-J_{WX}}{J_W} cov_{rX}$$

where $\alpha$ is the vector of expected returns, $\Omega$ the covariance matrix of returns, ${\mathbf 1}$ a unity vector $cov_{rX}$ the covariance between returns and the state variable. The optimal weights are:

$${\mathbf w^*} = \frac{-J_W}{J_{WW} W}\Omega^{-1}(\alpha - r_f {\mathbf 1}) - \frac{J_{WX}}{J_{WW}W}\Omega^{-1} cov_{rX}$$

Notice that the intertemporal model provides the same weights of the CAPM. Expected returns can be expressed as follows:

$$\alpha_i = r_f + \beta_{im} (\alpha_m - r_f) + \beta_{ih}(\alpha_h - r_f)$$

where m is the market portfolio and h a portfolio to hedge the state variable.

== See also ==
- Intertemporal portfolio choice
