= Inada =

Inada is a Japanese surname. Notable people with the surname include:

- Etsuko Inada (稲田 悦子; 1924–2003), Japanese figure skater
- Ken-Ichi Inada (稲田 献一; 1925–2002), Japanese economist
- Koji Inada (稲田 浩司; born 1964), Japanese manga artist
- Lawson Fusao Inada (born 1938), American poet, fifth poet laureate of the Oregon
- Masaru Inada (稲田 勝; born 1978), Japanese skeleton racer
- Masazumi Inada (稲田 正純; 1896–1986), lieutenant general in the Japanese Imperial Army during World War II
- Nada Inada (なだ いなだ; 1929–2013), the pen-name of a Japanese psychiatrist, writer and literary critic
- Naoto Inada (稲田 直人; born 1979), Japanese baseball player
- Noriko Inada (稲田 法子; born 1978), Japanese former swimmer who competed in the Olympic games
- Ryukichi Inada (稲田 龍吉; 1874–1950), Japanese physician, a prominent academic, and bacteriologist researcher
- Inada Syūichi (稲田 周一; 1902–1973), Japanese official and politician
- Tetsu Inada (稲田 徹; born 1972), Japanese voice actor who works for Aoni Production
- Tomomi Inada (稲田 朋美; born 1959), Japanese politician of the Liberal Democratic Party
- Yoko Inada (稲田 容子; born 1969), Japanese sport shooter

== See also ==
- Family Inada (Inada) is a Japanese manufacturer of robotic massage chairs
- Inada conditions, assumptions about the shape of a production function that guarantee the stability of an economic growth path
- Inada Station, a railway station on the Mito Line in Kasama, Ibaraki, Japan
- Inadan (disambiguation)
- Inanda (disambiguation)
