= Soroush Saghafian =

Iranian-American operations researcher and professor

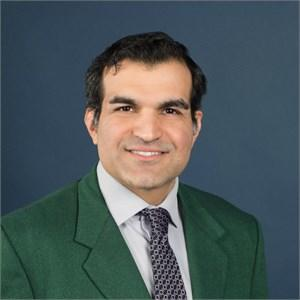
- Born: Iran
- Education: University of Michigan (Ph.D.); University of Michigan (M.S.); Sharif University of Technology (M.S.)
- Known for: Ambiguous Partially Observable Markov Decision Processes; Ambiguous Dynamic Treatment Regimes
- Awards: INFORMS MSOM Young Scholar Prize (2021); INFORMS Mehrotra Research Excellence Award (2020)
- Scientific career
- Fields: Operations Research Management Science Health Policy
- Workplaces: Harvard University

Soroush Saghafian is an Iranian-American operations researcher and an associate professor of Public Policy at the John F. Kennedy School of Government at Harvard University. He is best known for developing and applying artificial intelligence and operations research methods to improve healthcare systems.

== Education ==
Saghafian obtained an M.S. degree in Industrial Engineering from Sharif University of Technology in 2005 and an M.S. in Mathematics from the University of Michigan in 2009. He holds a Ph.D. in Industrial and Operations Engineering from the University of Michigan, awarded in 2012.

== Career ==
Saghafian is an associate professor of Public Policy at the John F. Kennedy School of Government at Harvard University. He is the founder of the Public Impact Analytics Science Lab (PIAS-Lab), dedicated to applying data science to complex societal issues. His work is noted for its practical impact, influencing both healthcare policy and clinical practices. In 2024, PIAS-Lab received a $3 million grant from the U.S. Department of Defense to develop AI-driven personalized treatments for melanoma in collaboration with the Dana-Farber Cancer Institute.

He serves on the editorial boards of several top-tier journals, including Management Science and Operations Research.

== Notable Contributions and Research Impact ==
Saghafian's research bridges advanced AI methods with real-world applications, notably within the healthcare sector. Saghafian developed the concepts of "Ambiguous Partially Observable Markov Decision Processes (APOMDP)" and "Ambiguous Dynamic Treatment Regimes" in operations research, methods that have improved clinical decision-making under uncertain conditions. This work, funded by the National Science Foundation, resulted in the various new findings for treating patients who undergo transplantation and develop risks of New-Onset Diabetes After Transplantation (NODAT).

His FDA-related research applies AI to improve medical device safety, significantly reducing recall rates by integrating human insights with machine learning algorithms. This approach could yield billions in healthcare cost savings by streamlining FDA review processes.

=== Media Features ===
Saghafian has been featured in various media outlets for his work and expertise in healthcare policy and AI in medicine. In an interview with Fast Company, he discussed the transformative potential of AI in healthcare. Euronews highlighted his expertise on the use of AI to predict patient responses to antidepressant treatment.

He has also provided expert analysis on healthcare policy and AI issues in PBS NewsHour, NBC News, WJCL (TV), and WFMJ.

=== Books ===
In 2025, Saghafian published Insight-Driven Problem Solving: Analytics Science to Improve the World with Cambridge University Press. The book provides an accessible overview of foundational ideas in analytics science and illustrates how these concepts can be applied across domains such as healthcare, education, climate science, public policy, and resource allocation.

== Selected Publications ==
- Saghafian, S. (2018). "Ambiguous partially observable Markov decision processes: Structural results and applications." Journal of Economic Theory, 178, 1–35. doi:10.1016/j.jet.2018.08.006.
- Saghafian, S. (2023). "Ambiguous Dynamic Treatment Regimes: A Reinforcement Learning Approach." Management Science. doi:10.1287/mnsc.2022.00883.
- Saghafian, S. (2025). Insight-Driven Problem Solving: Analytics Science to Improve the World. Cambridge University Press. ISBN 9781009379120.
