= Inanda =

Inanda may refer to:

- Inanda, Gauteng, a suburb of Johannesburg, South Africa
- Inanda, KwaZulu-Natal, a town outside Durban, South Africa
- Inanda, Sourou, a village of Burkina Faso
- SS Inanda, three ships of this name
- 1325 Inanda, asteroid
- Inanda (beetle), a genus of insects in the family Scarabeidae
