= Christine Shoemaker =

American environmental engineer

Christine A. Shoemaker
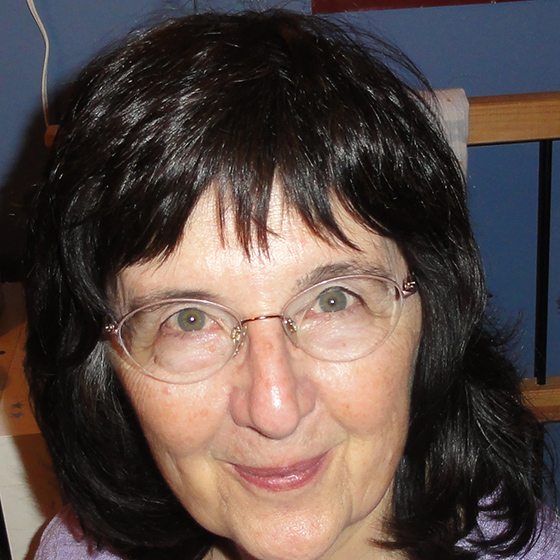
- Occupation: Distinguished Professor
- Organization(s): Cornell University & National University of Singapore
- Known for: Optimization Algorithms & Environmental Protection
- Website: https://sites.google.com/site/shoemakernusgroup/home

Christine A. Shoemaker joined the Department of Industrial Systems Engineering & Management and the Department of Civil and Environmental Engineering as NUS Distinguished Professor on 31 August 2015. Prof Shoemaker obtained her Ph.D. in mathematics from the University of Southern California supervised by Richard Bellman in Dynamic Programming. Upon her graduation, she joined the School of Civil and Environmental Engineering and later the School of Operations Research and Information Engineering at Cornell University, Ithaca, NY, USA. She was promoted to full Professor in 1985. From 1985 to 1988, Professor Shoemaker was the Chair of the Department of Environmental Engineering at Cornell University. In 2002 Prof. Shoemaker was appointed the Joseph P. Ripley Professor of Engineering at Cornell University, USA. In 2015, Prof. Shoemaker became Distinguished Professor at National University of Singapore, in both Industrial Systems Engineering and Management Department and Civil and Environmental Engineering Department. While in Singapore she has worked with Singapore water agency to apply her global optimization algorithms to improve the selection of parameters for computationally expensive partial differential equation models for lake hydrodynamics and complex multi-species water quality elements. These results used her group's new parallel algorithms.

== Education ==
- 1962-66 B.S. (Mathematics), University of California
- 1965-66 Enrolled at Universität Göttingen, Germany studying mathematics (in German)
- 1971 Ph.D. in mathematics, University of Southern California
  - Ph.D. Thesis Supervisor: Richard Bellman (Mathematics)
  - Ph.D. Minor Advisor: Gerhard Tintner (Economics)
  - Specialty: Nonlinear Optimal Control with application to Environment

== Research Interest ==
Prof. Shoemaker's research focuses on finding cost-effective, robust solutions for engineering problems by using computational mathematics for optimization, modeling, deep learning and statistical analyses. Her application areas include lake PDE model parameter calibration, physical and biological groundwater remediation, carbon sequestration, ecological analysis, and calibration of global climate and watershed models. This effort includes development of numerically efficient nonlinear optimization algorithms utilizing high-performance computing (including asynchronous parallelism) and applications to data on complex, nonlinear environmental systems.

Her algorithms address local and global continuous and integer optimization, stochastic optimal control, and uncertainty quantification problems. In her recent research algorithms, efficiency is improved with the use of surrogate response surfaces (usually with radial basis function (RBF)). The surrogates are iteratively built during the search process and with intelligent algorithms that effectively utilize computing distributed over parallel processors. The optimization and uncertainty quantification effort is used to improve model forecasts, to evaluate monitoring schemes and to have a tool for comparing alternative management practices. The objective functions can include partial differential equations or other computationally expensive models taking minutes or hours for each objective evaluation. Algorithms that are efficient because they require relatively few simulations are essential for doing calibration and uncertainty analysis on computationally expensive engineering simulation models.

At Cornell she was Principal Investigator on a CISE-NSF grant with David Bindel and PhD student David Eriksson. With this grant they built pySOT (a toolbox for surrogate global optimization) and POAP (for asynchronous parallelism). So pySOT has tools to construct a new surrogate algorithm or to modify previous algorithms. Both RBF (radial basis function) and GP (Gaussian Process) surrogates can be used in algorithm construction. pySOT has had over 230,000 downloads on PyPI.

Shoemaker's group at NUS has recently developed a collection of algorithms (GOA-RBF) that includes single, many, and multiple objective codes for continuous and integer variables, and single objective parallel algorithms, all of which are designed for computationally expensive multimodal, black box functions.

== National & International Honors And Awards ==
- Member, U.S. National Academy of Engineering 2012 For development of decision-making optimization algorithms for environmental and water resources problems.
- Distinguished (Honorary) Member, American Society of Civil Engineers 2006 (Highest Award of ASCE) “For her research on modeling and algorithms for identifying cost-effective, robust solutions for environmental engineering problems and for her professional and educational leadership” She is also a fellow of ASCE.
- National Engineering Award, American Association of Engineering Societies 2014 (one award per year over 5 major Engineering Societies in US (Civil, Electrical, Mechanical, Chemical, Industrial)) “For contributions to engineering education, research, and inspirational leadership including becoming in 1985 one of the very first women engineering Department Chairs in a U.S. university and founding and leading a 10-year international UNEP/SCOPE project on groundwater contamination in developing countries.
- Lifetime Achievement Award, American Society of Civil Engineering, Environmental and Water Resources Institute, 2015
- Fellow, Society for Industrial and Applied Mathematics (SIAM) Siam is the primary professional society for Applied Mathematics. 2014.
- Fellow, Institute for Operations Research and Management Science (INFORMS), Less than 0.15%/year of the members of INFORMS are elected fellows. INFORMS is the primary professional organization for the field of Operations Research. 2004
- Fellow, American Geophysical Union, status given to only 0.1%/year of the members of the American Geophysical Union. Citation: “For her pioneering contributions in research and graduate education in the area of water quality management, including modeling and optimization algorithm development for pesticide control and for physical and biological methods of groundwater remediation.” 2003
- Joseph P. Ripley Professor of Engineering, an endowed (distinguished) Chair awarded by Cornell University in 2002.
- Humboldt Research Prize from A. von Humboldt Foundation in Germany, 2001. Citation: “The Humboldt prize is awarded to Prof. Christine Shoemaker because of her years of research and leadership in the area of quantitative analysis of environmental problems and for her development of computationally efficient methods for analyzing these problems…” (This was only Humboldt Research Prize given in Civil Engineering or Operations Research in 2001.) Prize is about one year’s salary to do research in Germany.
- Julian Hinds Award, 1999 American Society of Civil Engineers (highest award given by the Water Resources Planning and Management Division in ASCE) Citation: “for her leadership and research in ecosystems management, water resources systems analysis, and groundwater modeling and protection” (Only one award given per year.)
- Margaret Peterson Award, 2014, American Society of Civil Engineers, Citation: “for her technical achievements, ASCE leadership, and commitment to mentoring women pursuing engineering careers that mirror the ideals the award’s namesake championed throughout her life”(one award per year)
- Fellow, 1996 American Society of Civil Engineers
- “Pioneers in Groundwater” Lecturer, ASCE Environmental and Water Resources Institute,” May 2012.
- Distinguished Educator Award, 1991 from the Society of Women Engineers (SWE). This is a national award given because "she has established herself as a competent and committed teacher, as an outstanding and productive researcher, as a successful administrator, and as a champion and role model for women in the field of engineering." (Only one award given per year in US.)
- Elected "Life Member" of Clare Hall, University of Cambridge, Cambridge, England, in 1990

== Patent ==
1."Weighted Nonlinear Feedback for Optimal Control under Uncertainty with Application to Groundwater Remediation," by Whiffen and Shoemaker (U.S. Patent 5,468,088)

2. Multi-Core Computer Processor Based on a Dynamic Core-Level Power Management for Enhanced Overall Power Efficiency, P. Patrica, A.M. Izraelevitz, D.H. Albonesi, and C.A. Shoemaker, U.S. Patent 10,088,891, issued 10/2/18.

(This patent generates royalties and is based on paper in prestigious computer architecture conference: Petrica, P., A. Izaelevitz, D.H. Albonesi, C.A. Shoemaker, “FLICKER A Dynamically Adaptive Architecture for Power Limited Multicore Systems”, ISCA’13 (40th Intern. Symp. On Computer Architecture), 2013) (This patent has been sold to industry by Cornell University)
