= Inanda congoana =

Scientific classification
- Kingdom: Animalia
- Phylum: Arthropoda
- Class: Insecta
- Order: Coleoptera
- Suborder: Polyphaga
- Infraorder: Scarabaeiformia
- Family: Scarabaeidae
- Genus: Inanda
- Species: I. congoana

Binomial name
- Inanda congoana Burgeon, 1945

Species of beetle

Inanda congoana is a species of beetle of the family Scarabaeidae. It is found in the Democratic Republic of the Congo and the Republic of the Congo.

== Description ==
Adults reach a length of about 5.5–7 mm (0.22–0.28 in). They are black or brown with whitish, usually dense scaling.
