= Inanda gracilis =

Scientific classification
- Kingdom: Animalia
- Phylum: Arthropoda
- Class: Insecta
- Order: Coleoptera
- Suborder: Polyphaga
- Infraorder: Scarabaeiformia
- Family: Scarabaeidae
- Genus: Inanda
- Species: I. gracilis

Binomial name
- Inanda gracilis Péringuey, 1902

Species of beetle

Inanda gracilis is a species of beetle of the family Scarabaeidae. It is found in South Africa (KwaZulu-Natal).

== Description ==
Adults reach a length of about 5 mm (0.20 in). The head, pronotum, pectus and scutellum are black, while the elytra, abdomen and legs are testaceous red. The head and clypeus are very scabrose and the whole head is covered with an erect, yellow pubescence. The pronotum is closely scabroso-punctate laterally but with the median part of the disk nearly impunctate, and with only a few punctures along the base, it is moderately densely covered with small, sub-squamiform yellow appressed hairs. The elytra are deeply impressed longitudinally along the suture and have a similar discoidal impression reaching from the base to the median part, it is finely but not closely punctured, and in each puncture there is a minute appressed yellow hair. The propygidium, pygidium and abdomen are clothed with hairs similar to those on the elytra.
