= Inanda nasuta =

Scientific classification
- Kingdom: Animalia
- Phylum: Arthropoda
- Class: Insecta
- Order: Coleoptera
- Suborder: Polyphaga
- Infraorder: Scarabaeiformia
- Family: Scarabaeidae
- Genus: Inanda
- Species: I. nasuta

Binomial name
- Inanda nasuta Burgeon, 1945

Species of beetle

Inanda nasuta is a species of beetle of the family Scarabaeidae. It is found in the Democratic Republic of the Congo.

== Description ==
Adults reach a length of about 4.5 mm (0.18 in). They are black, with whitish scales and hairs and brown tarsi.
