= Inanda trivialis =

Scientific classification
- Kingdom: Animalia
- Phylum: Arthropoda
- Class: Insecta
- Order: Coleoptera
- Suborder: Polyphaga
- Infraorder: Scarabaeiformia
- Family: Scarabaeidae
- Genus: Inanda
- Species: I. trivialis

Binomial name
- Inanda trivialis Péringuey, 1902

Species of beetle

Inanda trivialis is a species of beetle of the family Scarabaeidae. It is found in South Africa (KwaZulu-Natal, North West).

== Description ==
Adults reach a length of about 5.25–6 mm (0.207–0.236 in). They are black with the elytra chestnut-red. The head is very scabrose and is covered with sub-appressed flavescent hairs. The pronotum is scabroso-punctate, but more densely so on the anterior part, and clothed with a moderately long and moderately dense appressed flavescent pubescence. The elytra are irregularly punctured, and clothed with somewhat long, sub-squamiform, not closely set flavescent hairs. The propygidium, pygidium, underside and hind legs have almost similar appressed hairs.
