= Inadan =

Inadan may refer to:

- Inadan (city), a city in South Africa
- Inadan (African caste), a social stratum among the Tuareg people
