= Inanda stamperi =

Scientific classification
- Kingdom: Animalia
- Phylum: Arthropoda
- Class: Insecta
- Order: Coleoptera
- Suborder: Polyphaga
- Infraorder: Scarabaeiformia
- Family: Scarabaeidae
- Genus: Inanda
- Species: I. stamperi

Binomial name
- Inanda stamperi Schein, 1956

Species of beetle

Inanda stamperi is a species of beetle of the family Scarabaeidae. It is found in Tanzania.

== Description ==
Adults reach a length of about 6 mm (0.24 in). They are glossy black, with dull yellowish-white scales and brown antennae and legs.
