= Inanda sulcicollis =

Scientific classification
- Kingdom: Animalia
- Phylum: Arthropoda
- Class: Insecta
- Order: Coleoptera
- Suborder: Polyphaga
- Infraorder: Scarabaeiformia
- Family: Scarabaeidae
- Genus: Inanda
- Species: I. sulcicollis

Binomial name
- Inanda sulcicollis (Boheman, 1857)

Synonyms
- Peritrichia sulcicollis Boheman, 1857

Species of beetle

Inanda sulcicollis is a species of beetle of the family Scarabaeidae. It is found in South Africa (North West).

== Description ==
Adults reach a length of about 5 mm (0.20 in). They are black, with the anterior tibiae and all the tarsi piceous red, covered above and under and also on the legs with extremely long greyish flavescent hairs, and somewhat dense, ovate, greyish scales on the elytra, pronotum, pygidium and abdomen. The head is roughly punctate and the pronotum is scabroso-punctate in the anterior part, punctate in the posterior, and slightly grooved longitudinally towards the base. The elytra are very rugose, not plainly costulate, only slightly sinuate and attenuate laterally towards the apex.
