= Inanda gaerdesi =

Scientific classification
- Kingdom: Animalia
- Phylum: Arthropoda
- Class: Insecta
- Order: Coleoptera
- Suborder: Polyphaga
- Infraorder: Scarabaeiformia
- Family: Scarabaeidae
- Genus: Inanda
- Species: I. gaerdesi

Binomial name
- Inanda gaerdesi Schein, 1956

Species of beetle

Inanda gaerdesi is a species of beetle of the family Scarabaeidae. It is found in Namibia.

== Description ==
Adults reach a length of about 6 mm (0.24 in). They have a black ground colour, although it is reddish-brown on the disc of the elytra. Three longitudinal bands on the pronotum and the suture and marginal bands on the elytra consist of yellow (in males) and whitish (in females) scales. The pygidial area and margin of the underside have similar scales.
