= Inanda (beetle) =

Scientific classification
- Kingdom: Animalia
- Phylum: Arthropoda
- Class: Insecta
- Order: Coleoptera
- Suborder: Polyphaga
- Infraorder: Scarabaeiformia
- Family: Scarabaeidae
- Subfamily: Melolonthinae
- Tribe: Hopliini
- Genus: Inanda; Péringuey, 1902

Genus of leaf beetles

Inanda is a genus of beetles belonging to the family Scarabaeidae.

== Species ==
- Inanda congoana Burgeon, 1945
- Inanda gaerdesi Schein, 1956
- Inanda gracilis Péringuey, 1902
- Inanda nasuta Burgeon, 1945
- Inanda stamperi Schein, 1956
- Inanda sulcicollis (Boheman, 1857)
- Inanda trivialis Péringuey, 1902
