= Ken-Ichi Inada =

Japanese economist

- 稲田 献一
- Born: March 8, 1925; Gunma, Japan
- Died: May 17, 2002 (aged 77); Ninomiya, Kanagawa, Japan

Academic background
- Education: University of Tokyo (B.S. 1947)

Academic work
- Institutions: Tokyo Metropolitan University; Osaka University
- Notable ideas: Inada conditions
- Awards: Medal with Purple Ribbon (1989); Order of the Sacred Treasure, 2nd class (1997)

Ken-Ichi Inada (稲田 献一, Inada Ken'ichi; March 8, 1925 – May 17, 2002) was a Japanese economist.

Beginning in the 1950s, Inada wrote a number of important papers on welfare economics, economic growth and international trade. His contributions include an early extension of Kenneth Arrow's impossibility theorem on the existence of a social welfare function (1955). Inada's extension of the Stolper–Samuelson theorem to the many-good, many-factor case is also considered as a classic piece in trade theory (1971).

Inada has taught at universities including Osaka University and Tokyo Metropolitan University, served as a member of the honorary board of editors for the Japanese Economic Review since its first publishing in 1995, as well as being elected president of the Japanese Economic Association in 1980.

He is known for the Inada conditions on a production function that can guarantee the stability of an economic growth path in a neoclassical growth model.

== Selected journal articles ==
- Inada, Ken-Ichi (1955). "Alternative Incompatible Conditions for a Social Welfare Function". Econometrica. 23 (4): 396–399. doi:10.2307/1905346. JSTOR 1905346.
- Inada, Ken-Ichi (1963). "On a Two-Sector Model of Economic Growth: Comments and a Generalization". Review of Economic Studies. 30 (2): 119–127. doi:10.2307/2295809. JSTOR 2295809.
- Inada, Ken-Ichi (1964). "A Note on the Simple Majority Decision Rule". Econometrica. 32 (4): 525–531. doi:10.2307/1910176. JSTOR 1910176.
- Inada, Ken-Ichi (1969). "The Simple Majority Decision Rule". Econometrica. 37 (3): 490–506. doi:10.2307/1912796. JSTOR 1912796.
- Inada, Ken-Ichi (1971). "The Production Coefficient Matrix and the Stolper-Samuelson Condition". Econometrica. 39 (2): 219–239. doi:10.2307/1913342. JSTOR 1913342.
