= Inadan (city) =

- Location within Gauteng Location within South Africa
- Coordinates: 26.014°S 27.957°E
- Country: South Africa
- Province: Gauteng
- Municipality: City of Johannesburg
- Main Place: Randburg

Area
  - Total: 0.45 km^{2} (0.17 sq mi)

Population (2011)
  - Total: 153
  - Density: 340/km^{2} (880/sq mi)

Racial makeup (2011)
  - Black African: 58.6%
  - Coloured: 0.7%
  - White: 40.8%

First languages (2011)
  - English: 32.7%
  - Afrikaans: 13.1%
  - Sotho: 12.4%
  - Zulu: 9.8%
  - Other: 32.0%
- Time zone: UTC+2 (SAST)
- Postal code (street): 2196

Inadan is a suburb of Johannesburg, South Africa. It is located in Region A of the City of Johannesburg Metropolitan Municipality.
