= Family Inada =

Family Inada Co., Ltd.
- Native name: ファミリーイナダ株式会社
- Type: Private KK
- Industry: Medical equipment
- Founded: March 1962; 64 years ago
- Founder: Nichimu Inada
- Headquarters: Yodogawa-ku, Osaka, Japan
- Area served: Worldwide
- Key people: Nichimu Inada (President)
- Products: Massage chairs
- Number of employees: 450
- Website: www.inada-massagechair.com

Family Inada Co., Ltd. (Inada) (ファミリーイナダ株式会社, Famirī Inada Kabushiki-gaisha) is a Japanese manufacturer of massage chairs. Based in Osaka, Japan, Inada was founded in 1962 by Nichimu Inada and invented the first automatic shiatsu massage chair. Mr. Meishoku Kim is Inada's director of development.

Much of their technological development is done in their main headquarters in Osaka. The main factory is located in Nawa, a small town in the Tottori prefecture of Japan.

In 2001 Inada released the i.1 and the H.9 massage chairs. The H.9 was a Time magazine's Invention of the Year and became a bestseller in Japan. In 2003 the D.1 was released, and in 2008 Inada released the Sogno DreamWave, designed by Toshiyuki Kita.

The Sogno DreamWave (HCP-10001A) received 2009 Consumer Electronics Show (CES) Innovation Honors and was a 2009 American Society of Furniture Designers (ASFD) Pinnacle Award finalist. In 2010, Inada received two additional CES Innovations Honors for the Inada CUBE in the Home Appliance Category and the Doctor's Choice massage chair in the Health and Wellness Category.
