= Recursive competitive equilibrium =

In macroeconomics, recursive competitive equilibrium (RCE) is an equilibrium concept. It has been widely used in exploring a wide variety of economic issues including business-cycle fluctuations, monetary and fiscal policy, trade related phenomena, and regularities in asset price co-movements. This is the equilibrium associated with dynamic programs that represent the decision problem when agents must distinguish between aggregate and individual state variables. These state variables embody the prior and current information of the economy. The decisions and the realizations of exogenous uncertainty determine the values of the state variables in the next sequential time period. Hence, the issue is recursive. A RCE is characterized by time invariant functions of a limited number of 'state variables', which summarize the effects of past decisions and current information. These functions (decision rules) include (a) a pricing function, (b) a value function, (c) a period allocation policy specifying the individual's decision, (d) period allocation policy specifying the decision of each firm and (e) a function specifying the law of motion of the capital stock. Since decisions are made with all relevant information available, it is a rational expectations equilibrium.
