= SS Inanda =

Two ships operated by T & J Harrison Ltd were named Inanda.

- SS Inanda (1904), in service 1911–1920, then sold
- SS Inanda (1925), in service 1925–1940 and 1941–1942
