= Martin J. Beckmann =

German-American economist (1924–2017)

- Born: July 5, 1924; Ratingen, Germany
- Died: April 11, 2017 (aged 92); Providence, Rhode Island, USA

Academic background
- Education: University of Göttingen; University of Freiburg
- Thesis: Wirtschaftsordnung und Verteilung (1950)
- Doctoral advisor: Walter Eucken

Academic work
- Institutions: Yale University; University of Bonn; Technical University of Munich; Brown University

Martin Joseph Beckmann (5 July 1924 – 11 April 2017) was a professor for Economics and Applied Mathematics. He was professor at Yale University and Brown University, as well as the University of Bonn and the Technical University of Munich. He received honorary degrees from the University of Karlsruhe, the Umeå University and the University of the Bundeswehr Hamburg. He was president of the European Regional Science Association and received the Regional Science Founders Medal in 1983. His research spans a wide field in spatial analysis and regional economics, with a special focus on transport economics.

Martin Beckmann established basic principles for user behavior on congested transportation networks, as well as for optimal network vehicle flows, when user choices are respectively uncoordinated or coordinated. Beckmann’s contribution launched the new subfield of transportation network economics.

== Bibliography ==
- Beckmann, Martin; MacGuire, C. B.; Winsten, Christopher B. (1957). Studies in the Economics of Transportation. Yale University Press.
- Beckmann, Martin J. (1968). Location Theory. Random House.
- Beckmann, Martin J. (1968). Dynamic Programming of Economic Decisions. Berlin, Heidelberg: Springer Berlin Heidelberg. doi:10.1007/978-3-642-86449-0. ISBN 978-3-642-86451-3.
- Beckmann, Martin (1970). Makroökonomische Untersuchungen der Auswirkungen von Steuersystemänderungen (in German). Wiesbaden: Gabler Verlag. doi:10.1007/978-3-663-02028-8. ISBN 978-3-663-02029-5.
- Beckmann, Martin J. (1978). Rank in Organizations. Lecture Notes in Economics and Mathematical Systems. Vol. 161. Berlin, Heidelberg: Springer Berlin Heidelberg. doi:10.1007/978-3-642-95336-1. ISBN 978-3-540-09088-5.
- Beckmann, Martin J.; Puu, Tönu (1985). Spatial economics: density, potential, and flow. Studies in regional science and urban economics. Amsterdam; New York : New York, N.Y., U.S.A: North-Holland; Sole distributors for the U.S.A. and Canada, Elsevier Science Pub. Co. ISBN 978-0-444-87771-0.
- Beckmann, Martin J. (1988). Tinbergen Lectures on Organization Theory. Texts and Monographs in Economics and Mathematical Systems. Berlin, Heidelberg: Springer Berlin Heidelberg. doi:10.1007/978-3-642-83273-4. ISBN 978-3-642-83275-8.
- Beckmann, Martin J.; Puu, Tönu (1990). Spatial Structures. Advances in Spatial and Network Economics. Berlin Heidelberg: Springer. ISBN 978-3-642-75279-7.
- Bartmann, Dieter; Beckmann, Martin J. (1992). Inventory Control. Lecture Notes in Economics and Mathematical Systems. Vol. 388. Berlin, Heidelberg: Springer Berlin Heidelberg. doi:10.1007/978-3-642-87146-7. ISBN 978-3-540-55820-0.
- Beckmann, Martin J. (1999). Lectures on Location Theory. Berlin, Heidelberg: Springer Berlin Heidelberg. doi:10.1007/978-3-662-03762-1. ISBN 978-3-642-08501-7.
- Andersson, Åke E.; Beckmann, Martin J. (2009). Economics of Knowledge: Theory, Models and Measurements. Edward Elgar. ISBN 978-1-84720-675-6.
