= Transversality condition =

In optimal control theory, a transversality condition is a boundary condition for the terminal values of the costate variables. They are one of the necessary conditions for optimality infinite-horizon optimal control problems without an endpoint constraint on the state variables.

== See also ==
- Pontryagin's maximum principle
