= Shadow price =

Term in economics

A shadow price is the monetary value assigned to an abstract or intangible commodity which is not traded in the marketplace. This often takes the form of an externality. Shadow prices are also known as the recalculation of known market prices in order to account for the presence of distortionary market instruments (e.g. quotas, tariffs, taxes or subsidies). Shadow prices are the real economic prices given to goods and services after they have been appropriately adjusted by removing distortionary market instruments and incorporating the societal impact of the respective good or service. A shadow price is often calculated based on a group of assumptions and estimates because it lacks reliable data, so it is subjective and somewhat inaccurate.

The need for shadow prices arises as a result of “externalities” and the presence of distortionary market instruments. An externality is defined as a cost or benefit incurred by a third party as a result of production or consumption of a good or services, where the external effect is not being accounted for in the final cost-benefit analysis of its production. These inaccuracies and skewed results produce an imperfect market mechanism which inefficiently allocates resources.

Market distortion happens when the market is not behaving as it would in a perfect competition due to interventions by governments, companies, and other economic agents. Specifically, the presence of a monopoly or monopsony, in which firms do not behave in a perfect competition, government intervention through taxes and subsidies, public goods, information asymmetry, and restrictions on labour markets are distortionary effects on the market.

Shadow prices are often utilised in cost-benefit analyses by economic and financial analysts when evaluating the merits of public policy & government projects, when externalities or distortionary market instruments are present. The utilisation of shadow prices in these types of public policy decisions is extremely important given the societal impacts of those decisions. After incorporating shadow prices into the analysis, the impacts resulting from the policy or project may differ from the value obtained using market prices. This is an indication that the market has not properly priced the costs or benefits in the first place, or the market hasn’t priced them at all. By conducting analysis with shadow prices it allows analysts to determining whether doing the project will provide greater benefits than the costs incurred in totality. Not just the private or referent group benefits.

Although traditionally shadow prices have been used in government led research, the use of shadow prices in the private sector is becoming increasingly more common, as companies try to evaluate the social impacts of their decisions. As the desire for environmental, social, and corporate governance (ESG) investing has grown so has the need for companies and investors to evaluate the societal impacts of their production and investment decisions. This trend can be seen with the commitments made by most multinational corporations to reducing their CO_{2} emissions and acknowledging the impact their business activities have on society.

The figures below illustrate how shadow prices can effect efficient allocation of resources. Figure 1 illustrates a positive shadow price where the social marginal cost is less than the private marginal cost. An example of this is vaccinations, they provide a benefit to other people in society because after receiving one you no longer spread infectious diseases. The Private Marginal Cost (PMC) is simply the cost of producing the vaccines whereas the Social Marginal Cost (SMC) is the PMC less the net social benefit of getting vaccinated.

Figure 2 illustrates a negative shadow price where the social marginal cost is greater than the private marginal cost. An example of this is pollution, discarding toxic waste chemicals into waterways have a negative effect on fish stocks in the region, reducing local fisherman's income. In this instance Private Marginal Cost (PMC) is simply the cost of producing the chemicals whereas the Social Marginal Cost (SMC) is the PMC plus the net social cost of discarding toxic waste chemicals.

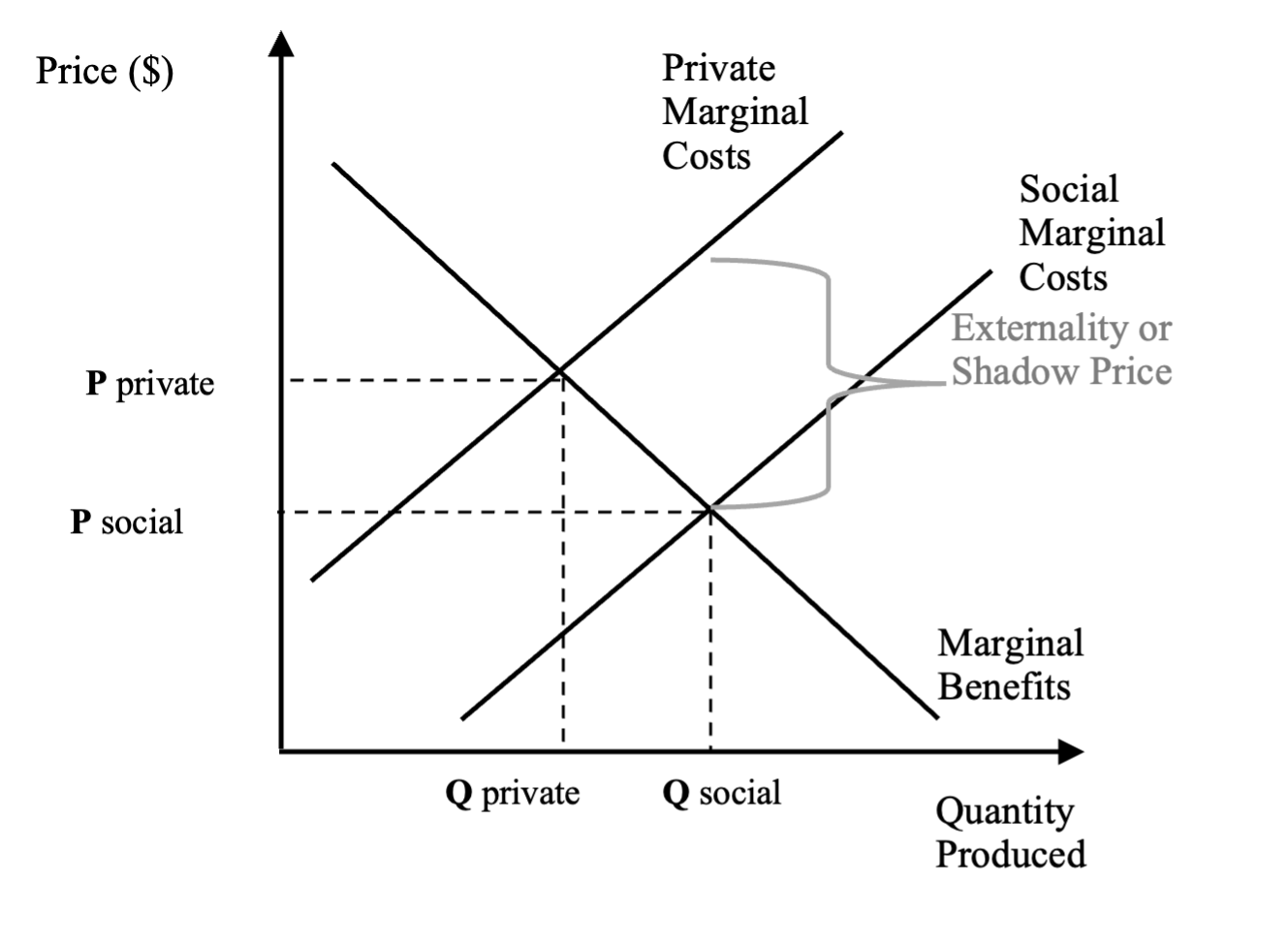
Figure 1: Illustrates the presence of a positive shadow price. In this case production should increase to meet the socially optimum equilibrium.

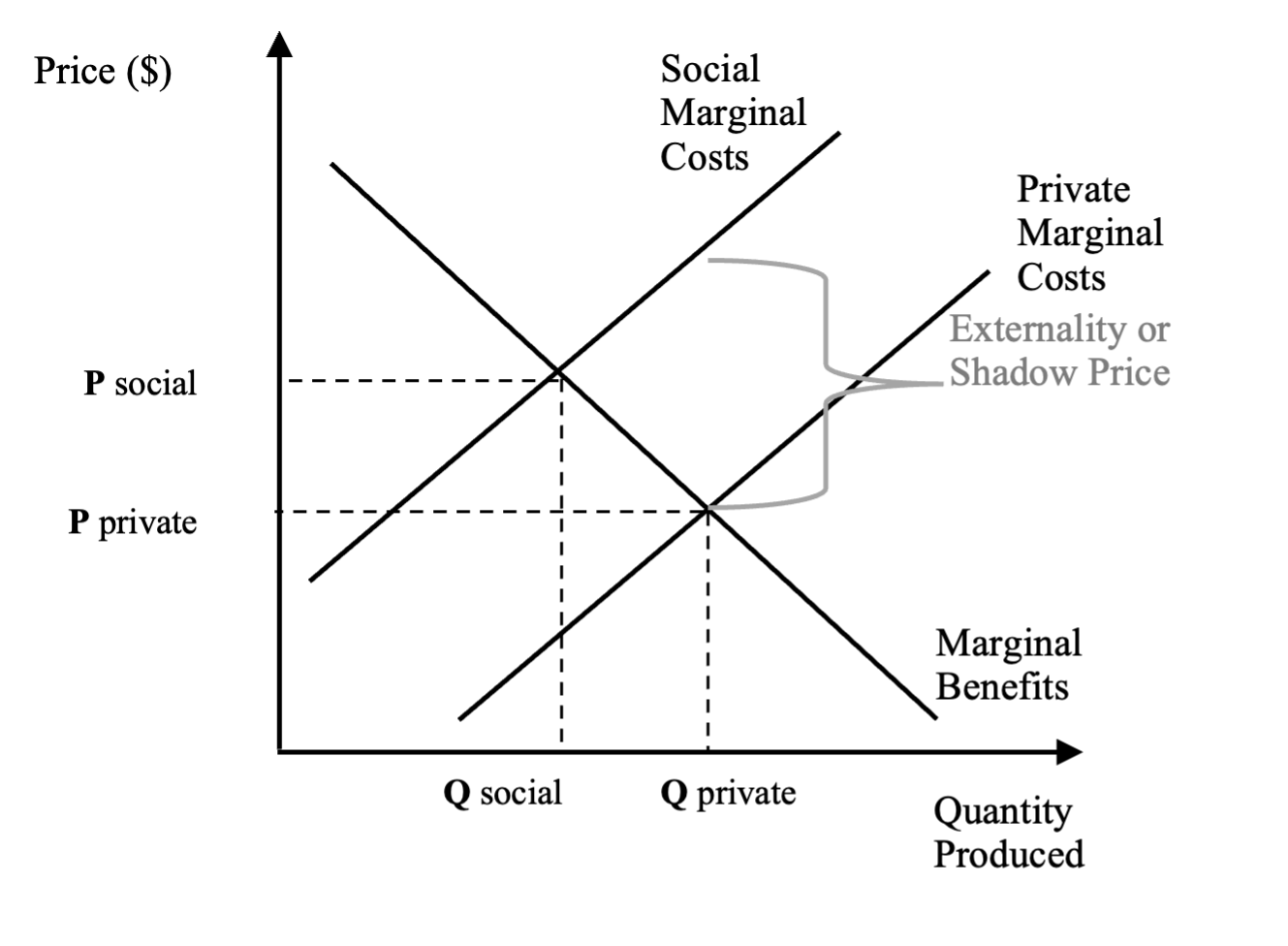
Figure 2: Illustrates the presence of a negative shadow price. In this case production should decrease to meet the socially optimum equilibrium.

== Cost-benefit analysis ==
Although shadow pricing may be inaccurate, it is still often used in cost-benefit analyses. Business owners and policymakers turn to shadow pricing to determine the cost the intangible costs and benefits of the project. There are usually many tools to estimate monetary values of these intangibles. They include contingent valuation, benefit value transfers, and revealed preferences which includes hedonic pricing and travel cost method.

Shadow pricing is frequently used to figure out the monetary values of intangibles which are hard to quantify factors during cost-benefit analyses. In the context of public economics, shadow pricing is very useful for governments and policymakers to evaluate whether a public project should be pursued. This is because public goods are very rarely exchanged in the market, making it difficult to determine its price. To help determine the monetary value of these goods, these three tools are often used. Take the example of a government determining whether it wants to undertake a freeway project that would save commuters 500,000 hours a year, save 5 lives a year, and reduce air pollution due to decreased congestion but with a present value cost of $250 million.

== Shadow wage ==
The shadow wage is the social cost of employing labour. It is especially important in evaluating public industrial projects in developing countries. It can differ from the market wage because creating a job can bring other social costs and benefits. Some prior work held that the shadow wage could be very low when rural labour is in surplus. Later work showed that it depends on how much society values saving relative to consumption, on migration from farms to cities, and on price distortions. Raaj Sah and Joseph Stiglitz drew these and some other strands together in a general model. Earlier models in the literature are special cases of it. Among other studies, the special cases are the models of Avinash Dixit and Nicholas Stern, Arnold Harberger, Ian Little and James Mirrlees, Amartya Sen, and Joseph Stiglitz.

The analysis of Sah and Stiglitz rests on several relationships concerning how the economy adjusts after a project, including how many workers leave farming when a job opens, how industrial productivity depends on the industrial wage, the gap between domestic and world prices, and what happens to the people who stay in farming. This analysis can be fitted to many different economies, depending on their particular circumstances. Among the newer insights that come from the Sah–Stiglitz shadow wage is that when investment is very scarce, the shadow wage is above the market wage if the domestic food price is below the world price, and below it if the food price is above.

== Contingent valuation ==
Contingent valuation is a stated preferences technique. Contingent valuation estimates the value a person places on a good by asking him or her directly. It is essentially surveys for individuals on how much they would be willing to pay for some intangible benefits or to avoid some intangible harms. Typically, these surveys contain detailed descriptions of hypothetical public goods or services, ask respondents how much they would pay for it, and collect relevant demographic data of these respondents. Some common types of these survey questions include: open-ended, referendum-type, payment-card type, and double-bounded referendum-type.

The advantage of contingent valuation is that it is sometimes the only feasible method for valuing a public good. This is especially the case when there is no obvious market price that one can use to determine the value. On the other hand, there are also many disadvantages of this method. For instance, how the survey is structured and how the questions are framed can lead to widely varying results and can induce bias into the results. Other times, the respondents may simply have no idea how much they value the public good in question.

In the freeway project example, policymakers can design a survey that asks respondents on how much they would pay to save a certain period of time or to spend less time in traffic. However, respondents may find it difficult or uncomfortable to put a value on a life.

== Benefit value transfers ==
Benefit value transfer method estimates the value or benefit of a project by using the data, model, functions, and results from a similar project or study with similar characteristics. There are two approaches for benefit value transfer: value transfer and function transfer. Value transfer involves transferring individual unit value from a former project or site to estimate for the new project. Correspondence or the identification of similar and accurate research is critical for the result estimation. In contrast, function transfer uses valuation functions derived from a number of studies. Meta-analysis can be used for creating valuation transfer. As such, using function transfer can provide a more accurate result.

Nonetheless, common errors in the benefit transfer method are measurement error and transfer error. Measurement errors can arise from bias in the selection of studies and assumptions made. Transfer errors are found in the similarity, accuracy, or correspondence in values. However, the benefit transfer method provides an economically efficient way to calculate economic value of a project when there are limitations in conducting original research, including time constraints and costs.

== Revealed preferences ==
Revealed preferences are based on observations on real world behaviors to determine how much individuals place on non-monetary outcomes. In other words, observing individuals' purchasing behaviors is the best way to determine their preferences. It assumes that individuals have made their purchasing decisions over other alternatives – making their final purchases the preferred one. It also allows room for the preferred choice to vary depending on the prices and the budgetary constraints. As such, by varying prices and budgetary constraints, a schedule can be created of an individual's/individuals' preferred choices under certain prices and constraints.

The advantage of revealed preferences is that it reduces biases that contingent valuation may bring. As it is based on real-world behaviors, it is much harder for individuals to manipulate or guess-work their answers. On the other hand, this tool also has its limits. For example, it is difficult to control for other factors that may make one prefer a choice over another. It also fails to fully incorporate indifference between two equally preferred choices.

In the freeway project example, where contingent valuation may fall short in determining how much individuals value lives, revealed preferences may be better suited. For instance, policymakers can look at how much more individuals need to be paid to take on riskier jobs that increase the probability of fatality. However, the drawbacks with revealed preferences also arise – in this case, if the riskier jobs increase the probability of not only death but also injury, or are also unpleasant in other respects, the higher wages may incorporate the other factors, misrepresenting the result.

=== Hedonic pricing ===
Hedonic pricing is a model that uses regression analysis to isolate the value of a specific intangible cost or benefit. It is based on the premise that price is determined by both internal characteristics and external factors. It also assumes that individuals value the characteristics of a good rather than the good itself, which implies that price will reflect a set of internal and external characteristics. It is most often used to calculate variances in housing prices that reflect the value of local environmental factors. The model is based on widely-available and relatively accurate market data, making this method uncontroversial and inexpensive to use.

As such, one of hedonic pricing's main advantages is that it can be used to estimate values on actual choices. This method is also very versatile and can be adapted to incorporate multiple other interactions with other factors. However, one of its major downfalls is that it is rather limited – it can mostly only measure things that are related to housing prices. It also assumes that individuals have the freedom and power to select the preferred combination given their income but in actuality, this may not be the case as the market may be influenced by changes in taxes and interest rates.

In the freeway project example, hedonic pricing may be useful to value the benefits of reduced air pollution. It can run a regression of home values on clean air with a variety of control variables that can include home size, age of home, number of bedrooms and bathrooms, crime statistics, school qualities, etc. Hedonic pricing may also be considered in quantifying the monetary value of time saved. It can run a regression of home values on proximity to work with a similar set of control variables.

==== Illustration #1 ====
Suppose a consumer with utility function $u$ faces prices $\,\! p_1,p_2$ and is endowed with income $\,\!m.$ Then the consumer's problem is:

$$\max \{ u(x_1,x_2) : p_1x_1+p_2x_2=m\}.$$

Forming the Lagrangian auxiliary function $L(x_1,x_2,\lambda):= u(x_1,x_2)+\lambda(m-p_1x_1-p_2x_2),$ taking first-order conditions and solving for its saddle point we obtain $x^*_1, \, x^*_2,\, \lambda^*$ which satisfy

$$\lambda^* = \left. \frac{\partial u(x^*_1,x^*_2)}{\partial x_1} \right/ p_1= \left. \frac{\partial u(x^*_1,x^*_2)}{\partial x_2} \right/ p_2.$$

This gives us a clear interpretation of the Lagrange multiplier in the context of consumer maximization. If the consumer is given an extra unit of income (the budget constraint is relaxed) at the optimal consumption level where the marginal utility per unit of income for each good is equal to $\,\! \lambda^*$ as above, then the change in maximal utility per unit of additional income will be equal to $\,\! \lambda^*$ since at the optimum the consumer gets the same amount of marginal utility per unit of income from spending his additional income on either good.

==== Illustration #2 ====
Holding prices fixed, if we define the indirect utility function as

$$U(p_1,p_2,m) = \max \{\,\!u(x_1,x_2)\mbox{ } :\mbox{ } p_1x_1+p_2x_2=m\},$$

then we have the identity

$$\,\! U(p_1,p_2,m)=u(x_1^*(p_1,p_2,m),x_2^*(p_1,p_2,m)),$$

where $\,\! x_1^*(\cdot,\cdot,\cdot),x_2^*(\cdot,\cdot,\cdot)$ are the demand functions, i.e. $x_i^*(p_1,p_2,m) = \arg\max \{\,\!u(x_1,x_2)\mbox{ } :\mbox{ } p_1x_1+p_2x_2=m\} \mbox{ for } i=1,2.$

Now define the optimal expenditure function

$$\,\! E(p_1,p_2,m) =p_1x_1^*(p_1,p_2,m)+p_2x_2^*(p_1,p_2,m).$$

Assume differentiability and that $\,\! \lambda^*$ is the solution at $\,\! p_1,p_2,m$, then we have from the multivariate chain rule:

$$\,\! \frac{\partial U}{\partial m} =\frac{\partial u}{\partial x_1}\frac{\partial x_1^*}{\partial m} + \frac{\partial u}{\partial x_2}\frac{\partial x_2^*}{\partial m} =\lambda^* p_1\frac{\partial x_1^*}{\partial m} + \lambda^* p_2 \frac{\partial x_2^*}{\partial m}=\lambda^* \left(p_1\frac{\partial x_1^*}{\partial m} +  p_2 \frac{\partial x_2^*}{\partial m} \right) =\lambda^* \frac{\partial E}{\partial m}.$$

Now we may conclude that

$$\,\! \lambda^* = \frac{\partial U/\partial m}{\partial E/\partial m} \approx \frac{\Delta \text{optimal utility }}{\Delta \text{optimal expenditure}}.$$

This again gives the obvious interpretation, one extra unit of optimal expenditure will lead to $\,\! \lambda^*$ units of optimal utility.

=== Travel cost method ===
Travel cost method is used to estimate the economic value of a recreation site using the travel cost each individual incur to travel to a recreational site. Costs include the opportunity costs of the time it takes to get to the site, transportation cost, accommodation costs, any parking fees, and so on. Additionally, the area from which the individuals are from are classified into zones. Therefore, costs incurred by each individual differ from one another. Moreover, the number of visits per year is also taken into account to indicate the willingness to pay.With the data, an aggregate demand curve is created.

There are two approaches: individual travel cost method and zonal travel cost method. The first one puts an emphasis on individual travel costs, number of visits a year, and other variables. The latter focuses on the number of annual visits from different zones.

However, it can be challenging to get data on the costs accurately incurred. the travel cost method does not accommodate the value or pleasure individuals have in the journey. Also, the method does not consider multi-purpose journeys, marginal costs, and only estimates the value of the site as a whole.

== Constrained optimization ==
In constrained optimization in economics, the shadow price is the change, per infinitesimal unit of the constraint, in the optimal value of the objective function of an optimization problem obtained by relaxing the constraint. If the objective function is utility, it is the marginal utility of relaxing the constraint. If the objective function is cost, it is the marginal cost of strengthening the constraint. In a business application, a shadow price is the maximum price that management is willing to pay for an extra unit of a given limited resource. For example, if a production line is already operating at its maximum 40-hour limit, the shadow price would be the maximum price the manager would be willing to pay for operating it for an additional hour, based on the benefits they would get from this change.

More formally, the shadow price is the value of the Lagrange multiplier at the optimal solution, which means that it is the infinitesimal change in the objective function arising from an infinitesimal change in the constraint. This follows from the fact that at the optimal solution the gradient of the objective function is a linear combination of the constraint function gradients with the weights equal to the Lagrange multipliers. Each constraint in an optimization problem has a shadow price or dual variable.

== Control theory ==
In optimal control theory, the concept of shadow price is reformulated as costate equations, and one solves the problem by minimization of the associated Hamiltonian via Pontryagin's minimum principle.

== See also ==
- Dual problem
- George Dantzig
- Leonid Kantorovich
- Linear programming
- Market price
- Ramsey–Cass–Koopmans model
- Reduced cost
