= Danskin's theorem =

Theorem in convex analysis

In convex analysis, Danskin's theorem is a theorem which provides information about the derivatives of a function of the form
$$f(x) = \max_{z \in Z} \phi(x,z).$$

The theorem has applications in optimization, where it sometimes is used to solve minimax problems. The original theorem given by J. M. Danskin in his 1967 monograph provides a formula for the directional derivative of the maximum of a (not necessarily convex) directionally differentiable function.

An extension to more general conditions was proven 1971 by Dimitri Bertsekas.

== Statement ==
The following version is proven in "Nonlinear programming" (1991). Suppose $\phi(x,z)$ is a continuous function of two arguments,
$$\phi : \R^n \times Z \to \R$$
where $Z \subset \R^m$ is a compact set.

Under these conditions, Danskin's theorem provides conclusions regarding the convexity and differentiability of the function
$$f(x) = \max_{z \in Z} \phi(x,z).$$
To state these results, we define the set of maximizing points $Z_0(x)$ as
$$Z_0(x) = \arg\max_{z\in Z} \phi(x,z) = \left\{\overline{z} : \phi(x,\overline{z}) = \max_{z \in Z} \phi(x,z)\right\}.$$
Danskin's theorem then provides the following results.

=== Convexity ===
If $\phi(x,z)$ is convex in $x$ for every $z \in Z$, then $f(x)$ is convex in $x$ (this extends the known fact that the maximum of finitely many convex functions is convex).

=== Derivative ===
If $Z_0(x)$ consists of a single element $\overline{z}$, then $f(x)$ is differentiable at $x$, and its derivative (or gradient if $x$ is a vector) equals the derivative of $\phi(x,z)$ at the unique arg-max:
$$\frac{\partial f}{\partial x} = \frac{\partial \phi(x,\overline{z})}{\partial x}.$$

=== Directional semi-derivative ===
If $Z_0(x)$ contains more than one element, then $f(x)$ is not differentiable at $x$, but it has a semi-differential. The semi-differential of $f(x)$ in the direction $y$, denoted $\partial_y\ f(x),$ is the maximum of different derivatives over all z:
$$\partial_y f(x) = \max_{z \in Z_0(x)} \phi'(x,z;y),$$
where $\phi'(x,z;y)$ is the directional derivative of the function $\phi(\cdot,z)$ at $x$ in the direction $y.$

==== Example of no directional derivative ====
In the statement of Danskin, it is important to conclude semi-differentiability of $f$ and not directional-derivative as explains this simple example. Set $Z=\{-1,+1\},\ \phi(x,z)= zx$, we get $f(x)=|x|$ which is semi-differentiable with $\partial_-f(0)=-1, \partial_+f(0)=+1$ but has not a directional derivative at $x=0$.

=== Subdifferential ===
If $\phi(x,z)$ is differentiable with respect to $x$ for all $z \in Z,$ and if $\partial \phi/\partial x$ is continuous with respect to $z$ for all $x$, then the subdifferential of $f(x)$ is given by
$$\partial f(x) = \mathrm{conv} \left\{\frac{\partial \phi(x,z)}{\partial x} : z \in Z_0(x)\right\}$$
where $\mathrm{conv}$ indicates the convex hull operation.

== Extension ==
The 1971 Ph.D. Thesis by Dimitri P. Bertsekas (Proposition A.22) proves a more general result, which does not require that $\phi(\cdot,z)$ is differentiable. Instead it assumes that $\phi(\cdot,z)$ is an extended real-valued closed proper convex function for each $z$ in the compact set $Z,$ that $\operatorname{int}(\operatorname{dom}(f)),$ the interior of the effective domain of $f,$ is nonempty, and that $\phi$ is continuous on the set $\operatorname{int}(\operatorname{dom}(f)) \times Z.$ Then for all $x$ in $\operatorname{int}(\operatorname{dom}(f)),$ the subdifferential of $f$ at $x$ is given by
$$\partial f(x) = \operatorname{conv} \left\{\partial \phi(x,z) : z \in Z_0(x)\right\}$$
where $\partial \phi(x,z)$ is the subdifferential of $\phi(\cdot,z)$ at $x$ for any $z$ in $Z.$

== See also ==
- Maximum theorem
- Envelope theorem
- Hotelling's lemma
