= René Roy (economist) =

French economist

- Born: 21 May 1894; Paris
- Died: 27 January 1977; Paris
- Education: École des Ponts ParisTech
- Known for: Roy's identity
- Scientific career
- Fields: Economics, Econometrics
- Workplaces: École des ponts ParisTech; University of Paris

René François Joseph Roy (1894–1977) was a French economist. He is primarily recognized for the contribution now known as Roy's identity. Roy was one of the pioneer econometricians in France who was leading the econometrics seminar in Paris for many years.

He became the president of the Econometric Society in 1953, replacing Paul Samuelson.

== Biography ==
Roy graduated from École polytechnique in 1914 and entered Corps of Bridges and Roads. He defended his doctoral dissertation in law in 1925.

He was injured in Chemin des Dames during the World War I when he was only 23 years old and become subsequently blind.

He held the post of the Chair of Econometrics in Paris Institute of Statistics starting from 1931.

== Publications ==
- Roy, René (1927). "Les index économiques". Revue d'économie politique.
- Roy, René (1930). "La demande dans ses rapports avec la répartition des revenus". Metron. 8 (3): 101–153.
- Roy, René (1931). "Les lois de la demande". Revue d'économie politique. 45: 1190–1218.
- Roy, René (1933). "Cournot et l'école mathématique". Econometrica. 1 (1): 13–22. doi:10.2307/1912227. JSTOR 1912227.
- Roy, René (1933). "La Demande dans ses rapports avec la répartition des revenus". Econometrica. 1 (3): 265–273. doi:10.2307/1907040. JSTOR 1907040.
- Roy, René (1936). Contribution aux recherches économétriques.
- Roy, René (1941). "Les Divers concepts en matière d'indices". Journal de la société de statistique de Paris. 82: 177–206.
- Roy, René (1943). "La Hiérarchie des besoins et la notion de groupes dans l'économie de choix". Econometrica. 1 (1): 13–24. doi:10.2307/1912227. JSTOR 1905715.
- Roy, René (1947). "La Distribution du revenu entre les divers biens". Econometrica. 15 (3): 205–225. doi:10.2307/1905479. JSTOR 1905479.
- Roy, René (1949). "Les nombres indices". Journal de la société de statistique de Paris. 90: 15–34.
- Roy, René (1951). "La Demande des biens indirects". Econometrica. 19 (4): 466–471. doi:10.2307/1907468. JSTOR 1907468.
- Roy, René (1949). "Pareto statisticien : la distribution des revenus". Revue d'économie politique. 59: 555–577.
- Roy, René (1952). "Les élasticités de la demande relative aux biens de consommation et aux groupes de biens". Econometrica. 20 (3): 391–405. doi:10.2307/1907411. JSTOR 1907411.
- Roy, René (1961). "Du rôle de la statistique dans l'élaboration des concepts". Journal de la société de statistique de Paris. 102: 212–220.
- Roy, René (1961). "Georges Darmois, 1888-1960". Econometrica. 29 (1): 80–83. doi:10.2307/1907690. JSTOR 1907690.
- Roy, René (1965). "Francois Divisia, 1889-1964". Econometrica. 33 (3a): 635–640. doi:10.2307/1911759. JSTOR 1911759.
- Roy, René (1970). Éléments d'économétrie.
