= Lagrange multipliers on Banach spaces =

In the field of calculus of variations in mathematics, the method of Lagrange multipliers on Banach spaces can be used to solve certain infinite-dimensional constrained optimization problems. The method is a generalization of the classical method of Lagrange multipliers as used to find extrema of a function of finitely many variables.

== The Lagrange multiplier theorem for Banach spaces ==
Let X and Y be real Banach spaces. Let U be an open subset of X and let f : U → R be a continuously differentiable function. Let g : U → Y be another continuously differentiable function, the constraint: the objective is to find the extremal points (maxima or minima) of f subject to the constraint that g is zero.

Suppose that u_{0} is a constrained extremum of f, i.e. an extremum of f on

$$g^{-1} (0) = \{ x \in U \mid g(x) = 0 \in Y \} \subseteq U.$$

Suppose also that the Fréchet derivative Dg(u_{0}) : X → Y of g at u_{0} is a surjective linear map. Then there exists a Lagrange multiplier λ : Y → R in Y^{∗}, the dual space to Y, such that

$$\mathrm{D} f (u_{0}) = \lambda \circ \mathrm{D} g (u_{0}). \quad \mbox{(L)}$$

Since Df(u_{0}) is an element of the dual space X^{∗}, equation (L) can also be written as

$$\mathrm{D} f (u_{0}) = \left( \mathrm{D} g (u_{0}) \right)^{*} (\lambda),$$

where (Dg(u_{0}))^{∗}(λ) is the pullback of λ by Dg(u_{0}), i.e. the action of the adjoint map (Dg(u_{0}))^{∗} on λ, as defined by

$$\left( \mathrm{D} g (u_{0}) \right)^{*} (\lambda) = \lambda \circ \mathrm{D} g (u_{0}).$$

== Connection to the finite-dimensional case ==
In the case that X and Y are both finite-dimensional (i.e. linearly isomorphic to R^{m} and R^{n} for some natural numbers m and n) then writing out equation (L) in matrix form shows that λ is the usual Lagrange multiplier vector; in the case n = 1, λ is the usual Lagrange multiplier, a real number.

== Application ==
In many optimization problems, one seeks to minimize a functional defined on an infinite-dimensional space such as a Banach space.

Consider, for example, the Sobolev space $X = H_0^1([-1,+1];\mathbb{R})$ and the functional $f : X \rightarrow \mathbb{R}$ given by

$$f(u) = \int_{-1}^{+1} u'(x)^{2} \, \mathrm{d} x.$$

Without any constraint, the minimum value of f would be 0, attained by u_{0}(x) = 0 for all x between −1 and +1. One could also consider the constrained optimization problem, to minimize f among all those u ∈ X such that the mean value of u is +1. In terms of the above theorem, the constraint g would be given by

$$g(u) = \frac{1}{2} \int_{-1}^{+1} u(x) \, \mathrm{d} x - 1.$$

However this problem can be solved as in the finite dimensional case since the Lagrange multiplier $\lambda$ is only a scalar.

== See also ==
- Pontryagin's minimum principle, Hamiltonian method in calculus of variations
