= Magnetic induction =

Magnetic induction may refer to:

- electromagnetic induction – a physical phenomenon where a changing magnetic field produces an electric field
- magnetic flux density – a physical quantity describing the magnitude and direction of the magnetic B field
