= Viscosity solution =

Solution to partial differential equation

In mathematics, the viscosity solution concept was introduced in the early 1980s by Pierre-Louis Lions and Michael G. Crandall as a generalization of the classical concept of what is meant by a 'solution' to a partial differential equation (PDE). It has been found that the viscosity solution is the natural solution concept to use in many applications of PDE's, including for example first order equations arising in dynamic programming (the Hamilton–Jacobi–Bellman equation), differential games (the Hamilton–Jacobi–Isaacs equation) or front evolution problems, as well as second-order equations such as the ones arising in stochastic optimal control or stochastic differential games.

The classical concept was that a PDE

$$F(x,u,Du,D^2 u) = 0$$

over a domain $x\in\Omega$ has a solution if we can find a function u(x) continuous and differentiable over the entire domain such that $x$, $u$, $Du$, $D^2 u$ satisfy the above equation at every point.

If a scalar equation is degenerate elliptic (defined below), one can define a type of weak solution called viscosity solution. Under the viscosity solution concept, u does not need to be everywhere differentiable. There may be points where either $Du$ or $D^2 u$ does not exist and yet u satisfies the equation in an appropriate generalized sense. The definition allows only for certain kind of singularities, so that existence, uniqueness, and stability under uniform limits, hold for a large class of equations.

== Definition ==
There are several equivalent ways to phrase the definition of viscosity solutions. See for example the section II.4 of Fleming and Soner's book or the definition using semi-jets in the Users Guide.

Degenerate elliptic
An equation $F(x,u,Du,D^2 u) = 0$ in a domain $\Omega$ is defined to be degenerate elliptic if for any two symmetric matrices $X$ and $Y$ such that $Y-X$ is positive definite, and any values of $x \in \Omega$, $u \in \mathbb{R}$ and $p \in \mathbb{R}^n$, we have the inequality $F(x,u,p,X) \geq F(x,u,p,Y)$. For example, $-\Delta u = 0$ (where $\Delta$ denotes the Laplacian) is degenerate elliptic since in this case, $F(x,u,p,X) = -\text{trace}(X)$, and the trace of $X$ is the sum of its eigenvalues. Any real first-order equation is degenerate elliptic.

Viscosity subsolution
An upper semicontinuous function $u$ in $\Omega$ is defined to be a subsolution of the above degenerate elliptic equation in the viscosity sense if for any point $x_0 \in \Omega$ and any $C^2$ function $\phi$ such that $\phi(x_0) = u(x_0)$ and $\phi \geq u$ in a neighborhood of $x_0$, we have $F(x_0,\phi(x_0),D\phi(x_0),D^2 \phi(x_0)) \leq 0$.

Viscosity supersolution
A lower semicontinuous function $u$ in $\Omega$ is defined to be a supersolution of the above degenerate elliptic equation in the viscosity sense if for any point $x_0 \in \Omega$ and any $C^2$ function $\phi$ such that $\phi(x_0) = u(x_0)$ and $\phi \leq u$ in a neighborhood of $x_0$, we have $F(x_0,\phi(x_0),D\phi(x_0),D^2 \phi(x_0)) \geq 0$.

Viscosity solution
A continuous function u is a viscosity solution of the PDE $F(x,u,Du,D^2 u) = 0$ in $\Omega$ if it is both a supersolution and a subsolution. Note that the boundary condition in the viscosity sense has not been discussed here.

== Example ==
Consider the boundary value problem $|u'(x)| = 1$, or $F(u') = |u'| -1 = 0$, on $(-1,1)$ with boundary conditions $u(-1) = u(1) = 0$. Then, the function $u(x) = 1-|x|$ is a viscosity solution.

Indeed, note that the boundary conditions are satisfied classically, and $|u'(x)| = 1$ is well-defined in the interior except at $x = 0$. Thus, it remains to show that the conditions for viscosity subsolution and viscosity supersolution hold at $x=0$. Suppose that $\phi(x)$ is any function differentiable at $x=0$ with $\phi(0) = u(0) = 1$ and $\phi(x) \geq u(x)$ near $x=0$. From these assumptions, it follows that $\phi(x) - \phi(0) \geq -|x|$. For positive $x$, this inequality implies $\lim_{x \to 0^+} \frac{\phi(x) - \phi(0)}{x} \geq -1$, using that $|x| / x = sgn(x) = 1$ for $x > 0$. On the other hand, for $x < 0$, we have that $\lim_{x \to 0^-} \frac{\phi(x) - \phi(0)}{x} \leq 1$. Because $\phi$ is differentiable, the left and right limits agree and are equal to $\phi'(0)$, and we therefore conclude that $|\phi'(0)| \leq 1$, i.e., $F(\phi'(0)) \leq 0$. Thus, $u$ is a viscosity subsolution. Moreover, the fact that $u$ is a supersolution holds vacuously, since there is no function $\phi(x)$ differentiable at $x=0$ with $\phi(0) = u(0) = 1$ and $\phi(x) \leq u(x)$ near $x=0$. This implies that $u$ is a viscosity solution.

In fact, one may prove that $u$ is the unique viscosity solution for such problem. The uniqueness part involves a more refined argument.

=== Discussion ===
Family of solutions $u_\varepsilon$ converging toward $u(x) = 1-|x|$.

The previous boundary value problem is an eikonal equation in a single spatial dimension with $f = 1$, where the solution is known to be the signed distance function to the boundary of the domain. Note also in the previous example, the importance of the sign of $F$. In particular, the viscosity solution to the PDE $-F = 0$ with the same boundary conditions is $u(x) = |x| - 1$. This can be explained by observing that the solution $u(x) = 1-|x|$ is the limiting solution of the vanishing viscosity problem $F(u') = [u']^2 - 1 = \varepsilon u''$ as $\varepsilon$ goes to zero, while $u(x) = |x| - 1$ is the limit solution of the vanishing viscosity problem $-F(u') = 1 - [u']^2 = \varepsilon u''$. One can readily confirm that $u_\varepsilon(x) = \varepsilon [\ln(\cosh(1/\varepsilon)) - \ln(\cosh(x/\varepsilon))]$ solves the PDE $F(u') = [u']^2 - 1 = \varepsilon u''$ for each $\varepsilon>0$. Further, the family of solutions $u_\varepsilon$ converges toward the solution $u = 1-|x|$ as $\varepsilon$ vanishes (see Figure).

== Basic properties ==
The three basic properties of viscosity solutions are existence, uniqueness and stability.

- The uniqueness of solutions requires some extra structural assumptions on the equation. Yet it can be shown for a very large class of degenerate elliptic equations. It is a direct consequence of the comparison principle. Some simple examples where comparison principle holds are
1. $u+H(x,\nabla u) = 0$ with H uniformly continuous in both variables.
2. (Uniformly elliptic case) $F(D^2 u, Du, u) = 0$ so that $F$ is Lipschitz with respect to all variables and for every $r \leq s$ and $X \geq Y$, $F(Y,p,s) \geq F(X,p,r) + \lambda ||X-Y||$ for some $\lambda>0$.
- The existence of solutions holds in all cases where the comparison principle holds and the boundary conditions can be enforced in some way (through barrier functions in the case of a Dirichlet boundary condition). For first order equations, it can be obtained using the vanishing viscosity method or for most equations using Perron's method. There is a generalized notion of boundary condition, in the viscosity sense. The solution to a boundary problem with generalized boundary conditions is solvable whenever the comparison principle holds.
- The stability of solutions in $L^\infty$ holds as follows: a locally uniform limit of a sequence of solutions (or subsolutions, or supersolutions) is a solution (or subsolution, or supersolution). More generally, the notions of viscosity sub- and supersolution are also conserved by half-relaxed limits.

== History ==
The term viscosity solutions first appear in the work of Michael G. Crandall and Pierre-Louis Lions in 1983 regarding the Hamilton–Jacobi equation. The name is justified by the fact that the existence of solutions was obtained by the vanishing viscosity method. The definition of solution had actually been given earlier by Lawrence C. Evans in 1980. Subsequently the definition and properties of viscosity solutions for the Hamilton–Jacobi equation were refined in a joint work by Crandall, Evans and Lions in 1984.

For a few years the work on viscosity solutions concentrated on first order equations because it was not known whether second order elliptic equations would have a unique viscosity solution except in very particular cases. The breakthrough result came with the method introduced by Robert Jensen in 1988 to prove the comparison principle using a regularized approximation of the solution which has a second derivative almost everywhere (in modern versions of the proof this is achieved with sup-convolutions and Alexandrov theorem).

In subsequent years the concept of viscosity solution has become increasingly prevalent in analysis of degenerate elliptic PDE. Based on their stability properties, Barles and Souganidis obtained a very simple and general proof of convergence of finite difference schemes. Further regularity properties of viscosity solutions were obtained, especially in the uniformly elliptic case with the work of Luis Caffarelli. Viscosity solutions have become a central concept in the study of elliptic PDE. In particular, Viscosity solutions are essential in the study of the infinity Laplacian.

In the modern approach, the existence of solutions is obtained most often through the Perron method. The vanishing viscosity method is not practical for second order equations in general since the addition of artificial viscosity does not guarantee the existence of a classical solution. Moreover, the definition of viscosity solutions does not generally involve physical viscosity. Nevertheless, while the theory of viscosity solutions is sometimes considered unrelated to viscous fluids, irrotational fluids can indeed be described by a Hamilton-Jacobi equation. In this case, viscosity corresponds to the bulk viscosity of an irrotational, incompressible fluid. Other names that were suggested were Crandall–Lions solutions, in honor to their pioneers, $L^\infty$-weak solutions, referring to their stability properties, or comparison solutions, referring to their most characteristic property.
