= Andrea Eisfeldt =

Financial economist; Professor

Academic background
- Education: University of Chicago (Ph.D., M.A.), University of Illinois at Urbana-Champaign (B.S.)
- Doctoral advisor: John Cochrane, Lars Hansen (co-chairs), Douglas Diamond

Academic work
- Discipline: Finance
- Institutions: University of California, Los Angeles

Andrea L. Eisfeldt is the Laurence D. and Lori W. Fink Endowed Chair in Finance at the UCLA Anderson School of Management. Her research in the area of macro finance has been awarded prizes from the Journal of Finance and Journal of Financial Economics, and grants by the National Science Foundation and the Banque de France.

Prior to her position at UCLA Anderson, she was a tenured professor at the Kellogg School of Management at Northwestern University. Professor Eisfeldt has served as Chief Economist at a Fixed Income hedge fund, and as a Fixed Income strategies consultant for AQR Capital Management. She is currently an affiliate of Cornerstone Research, serves on the academic advisory board of Vise, and has developed licensed equity indices based on her research on intangible assets in equity investing.

== Education ==
Eisfeldt earned a B.S. with Highest Honors from the University of Illinois at Urbana-Champaign in 1994, and received her M.A. and Ph.D. in economics from the University of Chicago in 2000. She then spent a decade at the Kellogg School of Management at Northwestern University, receiving tenure in 2007. In 2011, she joined the Anderson School of Management at University of California, Los Angeles. She is currently the Laurence D. and Lori W. Fink Endowed Chair in Finance at UCLA Anderson.

== Career ==
Her papers have appeared as lead articles in top journals and have been recognized with the Amundi Smith Breeden Prize in the Journal of Finance (twice), the Jensen Prize in the Journal of Financial Economics, and the Edwin C. Mills Best Paper Prize in Real Estate Economics. She has received research grants from the National Science Foundation, the U.S. Treasury Office of Financial Research, and the Banque de France, and delivered the keynote address at the Society for Financial Studies Cavalcade. She previously served as a Board Member of the American Finance Association on its strategic planning, ethics, and investment committees, on the Board of the Western Finance Association, and as a founding member and later President of the Macro Finance Society. She is the VP of the American Finance Association and the VP-elect of the Western Finance Association.

In addition to her 25-year career in research and teaching in finance at UCLA's Anderson School of Management and at Northwestern’s Kellogg School of Management, Eisfeldt has extensive experience in asset management. Based on her academic research and asset management practice, she developed the NEXT Intangible Index, which is licensed to Simplify ETFs. Previously, she served as Chief Economist at hedge fund Structured Portfolio Management and consultant to AQR Capital Management. She currently serves on the Board of the UCLA Investment Company. She is also an academic advisor to Vise (a FinTech investment management firm), an Economic Consultant affiliated with Cornerstone Research, and a Visiting Scholar at the San Francisco Fed.

== Academic work ==
Eisfeldt’s research has advanced understanding of intangible assets in firm valuation and the macroeconomy, the drivers and measurement of liquidity, and capital reallocation as a determinant of business cycles and growth. Her current work explores new measures and impacts of intangibles, the role of equity pay beyond the C-suite, the consequences of artificial intelligence for labor and firm values, as well as the pricing of fixed-income assets including bank deposits and corporate bonds.

Eisfeldt is an Associate Editor at the Journal of Political Economy, Journal of Finance: Insights and Perspectives, Journal of Economic Perspectives, and Annual Review of Financial Economics. She is a research associate at the National Bureau of Economic Research in the Corporate Finance, Asset Pricing, Economic Fluctuations and Growth, and Conference on Research in Income and Wealth programs, and is a Visiting Scholar at the Federal Reserve Bank of San Francisco.

=== Selected publications ===
- Eisfeldt, Andrea L. (2004). "Endogenous Liquidity in Asset Markets". The Journal of Finance. 59 (1): 1–30. doi:10.1111/j.1540-6261.2004.00625.x.
- Eisfeldt, Andrea L.; Rampini, Adriano A. (2006). "Capital reallocation and liquidity". Journal of Monetary Economics. 53 (3): 369–399. doi:10.1016/j.jmoneco.2005.04.006.
- Eisfeldt, Andrea L. (2007). "Smoothing with liquid and illiquid assets". Journal of Monetary Economics. 54 (6): 1572–1586. doi:10.1016/j.jmoneco.2006.06.004.
- Eisfeldt, Andrea L.; Rampini, Adriano A. (2007). "New or used? Investment with credit constraints". Journal of Monetary Economics. 54 (8): 2656–2681. doi:10.1016/j.jmoneco.2007.06.030.
- Eisfeldt, Andrea L.; Rampini, Adriano A. (2008). "Managerial incentives, capital reallocation, and the business cycle". Journal of Financial Economics. 87 (1): 177–199. doi:10.1016/j.jfineco.2006.11.007.
- Eisfeldt, Andrea L.; Rampini, Adriano A. (2009). "Leasing, Ability to Repossess, and Debt Capacity". Review of Financial Studies. 22 (4): 1621–1657. doi:10.1093/rfs/hhn026.
- Eisfeldt, Andrea L.; Kuhnen, Camelia M. (2013). "CEO turnover in a competitive assignment framework". Journal of Financial Economics. 109 (2): 351–372. doi:10.1016/j.jfineco.2013.02.020.
- Atkeson, Andrew G.; Eisfeldt, Andrea L.; Weill, Pierre-Olivier (2015). "Entry and Exit in OTC Derivatives Markets". Econometrica. 83 (6): 2231–2292. doi:10.3982/ECTA11477.
- Eisfeldt, Andrea L.; Muir, Tyler (2016). "Aggregate external financing and savings waves". Journal of Monetary Economics. 84: 116–133. doi:10.1016/j.jmoneco.2016.10.002.
- Atkeson, Andrew G.; Eisfeldt, Andrea L.; Weill, Pierre-Olivier (2017). "Measuring the financial soundness of U.S. firms, 1926–2012". Research in Economics. 71 (3): 613–635. doi:10.1016/j.rie.2017.05.003.
- Atkeson, Andrew G.; d’Avernas, Adrien; Eisfeldt, Andrea L.; Weill, Pierre-Olivier (2019). "Government Guarantees and the Valuation of American Banks". NBER Macroeconomics Annual. 33: 81–145. doi:10.1086/700893.
- Eisfeldt, Andrea L.; Shi, Yu (2018). "Capital Reallocation". Annual Review of Financial Economics. 10 (1): 361–386. doi:10.1146/annurev-financial-110217-023000.
- Diep, Peter; Eisfeldt, Andrea L.; Richardson, Scott (2021). "The Cross Section of MBS Returns". The Journal of Finance. 76 (5): 2093–2151. doi:10.1111/jofi.13055.
- Demers, Andrew; Eisfeldt, Andrea L. (2022). "Total returns to single‐family rentals". Real Estate Economics. 50 (1): 7–32. doi:10.1111/1540-6229.12353.
- Eisfeldt, Andrea L.; Falato, Antonio; Xiaolan, Mindy Z. (2023). "Human Capitalists". NBER Macroeconomics Annual. 37: 1–61. doi:10.1086/723534.
- Crouzet, Nicolas; Eberly, Janice C.; Eisfeldt, Andrea L.; Papanikolaou, Dimitris (2022). "The Economics of Intangible Capital". Journal of Economic Perspectives. 36 (3): 29–52. doi:10.1257/jep.36.3.29.
- Eisfeldt, Andrea L; Herskovic, Bernard; Rajan, Sriram; Siriwardane, Emil (2023). "OTC Intermediaries". The Review of Financial Studies. 36 (2): 615–677. doi:10.1093/rfs/hhac062.
- Eisfeldt, Andrea L.; Lustig, Hanno; Zhang, Lei (2023). "Complex Asset Markets". The Journal of Finance. 78 (5): 2519–2562. doi:10.1111/jofi.13264.
- Chang, Huifeng; D'Avernas, Adrien; Eisfeldt, Andrea L. (2024). "Bonds versus Equities: Information for Investment". The Journal of Finance. 79 (6): 3893–3941. doi:10.1111/jofi.13396.

== NXTI Next Intangible Core Index ==
Eisfeldt developed the Next Intangible Core Index, which is licensed buy, an ETF which offers modernized equity investing by incorporating the most powerful asset that companies have: Intangible Capital.

=== Media coverage ===
- Bloomberg ETF IQ 09/30/2024 (at minute 17:30)
- ETF Prime Podcast
- AFO Wealth Management Forward Podcast
- Future Proof Panel (Intangible Value discussed starting around minute 10)
- Barrons: What Value Investing Strategies Are Missing
- Anderson Review: Adapting Value Investing to the 21st Century
- Vox EU: Intangible value

=== Relevant published work on measuring intangibles ===
- Eisfeldt, Andrea L.; Papanikolaou, Dimitris (2013). "Organization Capital and the Cross‐Section of Expected Returns". The Journal of Finance. 68 (4): 1365–1406. doi:10.1111/jofi.12034.
- Eisfeldt, Andrea L.; Papanikolaou, Dimitris (2014). "The Value and Ownership of Intangible Capital". American Economic Review. 104 (5): 189–194. doi:10.1257/aer.104.5.189.
- L. Eisfeldt, Andrea; T. Kim, Edward; Papanikolaou, Dimitris (2022). "Intangible Value". Critical Finance Review. 11 (2): 299–332. doi:10.1561/104.00000113.

== Fellowships, awards and honors ==
Sources:

- 1996–1999 – University of Chicago Century Scholarship.
- 1997 – National Science Foundation Honorable Mention.
- 1998 – Lee Prize for Best Money and Banking Paper, University of Chicago.
- 1999 – Margaret Reid Dissertation Fellowship.
- 2003, 2004 – Searle Fund Grant.
- 2004 – Smith Breeden Distinguished Paper Award, Journal of Finance.
- 2008 – Jensen Prize, Second Place, Journal of Financial Economics.
- 2011 – Fink Center Research Grant.
- 2012 – Fink and Ziman Center Data Purchase Grant.
- 2013 – Excellence in Refereeing Award, American Economic Review.
- 2012–2013 – Bank of France Research Grant.
- 2013 – Amundi Smith Breeden First Prize Paper Award, Journal of Finance.
- 2013–2016 – National Science Foundation Grant.
- 2017 – Macro Financial Modeling Grant.
- 2017 – Keynote Speaker, 12th Annual Hedge Fund Conference, Imperial College.
- 2022 – Keynote Speaker, Midwest Finance Association.
- 2022 – Keynote Speaker and Chair, Society for Financial Studies Cavalcade.
- 2022 – Edwin Mills Best Paper Award, Real Estate Economics.
- 2023 – Market Frictions and Financial Stability Grant, US Treasury OFR and NSF.
