= Sheridan Titman =

- Born: May 23, 1954 (age 72); Denver, Colorado

Academic background
- Education: Carnegie Mellon University; University of Colorado

Academic work
- Discipline: Financial economics, including energy finance, investment banking, and real estate finance
- Institutions: McCombs School of Business
- Awards: Smith Breeden Prize, 1997; Batterymarch Fellowship, 1985
- Website: Information at IDEAS / RePEc

Sheridan Dean Titman is a professor of finance at the University of Texas at Austin, where he holds the McAllister Centennial Chair in Financial Services at the McCombs School of Business. He received a B.S. degree (1975) from the University of Colorado and an M.S. (1978) and Ph.D. (1981) from Carnegie Mellon University.

== Career ==
Titman previously taught at UCLA, where he was the chair for the department of finance. Between 1992 and 1994, he was one of the founding professors of the School of Business and Management at the Hong Kong University of Science and Technology. From 1994 to 1997, he served as the John J. Collins, S.J. Chair in Finance at Boston College. From 1988–89, Titman worked in Washington D.C. as the special assistant to the Treasury Assistant Secretary for Economic Policy.

Titman's academic publications include articles on asset pricing, corporate finance, and real estate. Sheridan won the Smith-Breeden Prize for the best finance research paper published in the Journal of Finance, the GSAM best paper award for the Review of Finance and was a recipient of the Batterymarch Fellowship.

Titman served on the editorial boards of the Journal of Finance and the Review of Financial Studies. He co-authored three finance textbooks, Financial Markets and Corporate Strategy, Valuation: The Art and Science of Corporate Investment Decisions, and Financial Management: Principles and Applications. In 2012 he succeeded Raghuram Rajan as the President of the American Finance Association and served as the President of the Western Finance Association. He has also served as Director of the Asia Pacific Finance Association and the Financial Management Association.

=== Momentum investing ===
Titman's most well known research has been on Momentum investing. Momentum investing is an investment strategy that aims to capitalize on the continuance of existing trends in the market.

In 1993, Narasimhan Jegadeesh and Titman published Returns to Buying Winners and Selling Losers: Implications for Stock Market Efficiency. A study economist Robert Shiller called a bombshell.

Follow up research on Titman's momentum paper has been done in academia and private organizations such as Cliff Asness's AQR Capital Management. Investment managers such as Paul Woolly have criticized Momentum Investing, claiming it leads to asset bubbles.

== Select awards and honors ==
- Smith Breeden Prize for best paper in the Journal of Finance, 1997
- Batterymarch Fellowship, 1985
- President of the American Finance Association, 2012
- Institute for Scientific Information highly cited researcher

== Selected bibliography ==
=== Books ===
- Keown, Arthur; John Martin; Sheridan Titman (2010). Financial Management: Principles and Applications. Prentice Hall. ISBN 978-0132544337
- Titman, Sheridan; John Martin (2007). Valuation: The Art and Science of Corporate Investment Decisions. Reading, MA: Addison-Wesley. ISBN 978-0-321-33610-1
- Grinblatt, Mark; Sheridan Titman (2002). Financial Markets and Corporate Strategy. Boston: McGraw-Hill. ISBN 978-0-07-229433-0.

=== Articles ===
- Narasimhan Jegadeesh and Sheridan Titman. 2011. Momentum. Annual Review of Financial Economics 3, 493–509.
- Sheridan Titman and Cristian-Ioan Tiu. 2011. Do the Best Hedge Funds Hedge?. Review of Financial Studies 24, 123–168.
- Ravi Anshuman, John Martin, and Sheridan Titman. 2011. Accounting for Sovereign Risk When Investing in Emerging Markets. Journal of Applied Corporate Finance 23, 41–49.
- Eric Jacquier, Sheridan Titman, and Atakan Yalçin. 2010. Predicting systematic risk: Implications from growth options. Journal of Empirical Finance 17, 991–1005.
- Sheridan Titman and Sergey Typlakov. 2010. Originator Performance, CMBS Structures and Yield Spreads of Commercial Mortgages. Review of Financial Studies 23, 3558–3594.
- Jay Hartzell, Toby Muhlhofer, and Sheridan Titman. 2010. Alternative Benchmarks for Evaluating Mutual Fund Performance. Real Estate Economics 38, 121–154.
- Sheridan Titman. 2010. The Leverage of Hedge Funds. Financial Research Letters 7, 2–7.
- Andres Almazan, Adolfo de Motta, Sheridan Titman, and Vahap Uysal. 2010. Financial Structure, Acquisition Opportunities, and Firm Locations. Journal of Finance 65, 529–563.

== See also ==
- Momentum (finance)
- Momentum investing
- Mutual funds
- Carnegie School
