= Craig W. Holden =

- Died: 2021; Bloomington, IN

Academic background
- Education: University of California, Los Angeles
- Doctoral advisor: Michael Brennan

Craig Woodworth Holden was the finance department chair and Gregg T. and Judith A. Summerville Chair of Finance at the Kelley School of Business at Indiana University. His research focused on market microstructure.

== Biography ==
Holden received his M.B.A. and Ph.D. from the Anderson School of Management at UCLA. He received the Fama-DFA Prize for the second best paper in capital markets published in the Journal of Financial Economics in 2009, the Spangler-IQAM Award for the best investments paper published in the Review of Finance in 2017-2018, and the Philip Brown Prize for the best paper published in 2017 using SIRCA data. His research has been cited more than 4,300 times. He has written two books on financial modeling in Excel: Excel Modeling in Investments and Excel Modeling in Corporate Finance. He has chaired 22 dissertations, been a member or chair of 62 dissertations, and serves on the program committees of the Western Finance Association and European Finance Association. He was secretary-treasurer of the Society for Financial Studies. He was an associate editor of the Journal of Financial Markets.

== Research ==
Holden's research has appeared in leading journals, including the Journal of Finance, Journal of Financial Economics, Review of Financial Studies, Review of Finance, Journal of Business, Journal of Financial Markets, Review of Corporate Finance Studies, Critical Finance Review, Journal of Corporate Finance, Journal of Financial Intermediation, Journal of Empirical Finance, Foundations and Trends in Finance, Financial Analysts Journal, Journal of Business Finance and Accounting, Mathematical Finance, and Management Science. His working papers are posted on the Social Science Research Network. His research has received attention in the Financial Times. and other media. He is best known for the following publications:

- Kingsley Y.L. Fong, Craig W. Holden, and Charles A. Trzcinka, 2017, What Are The Best Liquidity Proxies For Global Research?, Review of Finance 21, 1355-1401.
- Craig W. Holden and Stacey Jacobsen, 2014, Liquidity Measurement Problems in Fast, Competitive Markets: Expensive and Cheap Solutions, Journal of Finance 69, 1747-1785.
- Craig W. Holden, Stacey Jacobsen, and Avanidhar Subrahmanyam, 2014, The Empirical Analysis of Liquidity, Foundations and Trends in Finance 8, No. 4, 263-365.
- Utpal Bhattacharya, Craig W. Holden, and Stacey Jacobsen, 2012, Penny Wise, Dollar Foolish: Buy-Sell Imbalances On and Around Round Numbers, Management Science 15, 413-431.
- Ruslan Goyenko, Craig W. Holden, and Charles A. Trzcinka, 2009, Do Liquidity Measures Measure Liquidity?, Journal of Financial Economics 92, 153-181.
- Craig W. Holden and Avanidhar Subrahmanyam, 2002, News Events, Information Acquisition, and Stock Price Behavior, Journal of Business 75, 1-32.
- Craig W. Holden and Avanidhar Subrahmanyam, 1996, Risk Aversion, Liquidity, and Endogenous Short Horizons, Review of Financial Studies 9, 691-722.
- Craig W. Holden and Avanidhar Subrahmanyam, 1992, Long-Lived Private Information and Imperfect Competition, Journal of Finance 47, 247-270.

== Teaching ==
Holden's book, Excel Modeling in Investments (Fifth Edition; ISBN 9780205987245) teaches students how to build investments models in Excel. It covers fixed income, portfolio management, security analysis, asset pricing, international investments, options, futures, and other derivatives. His book, Excel Modeling in Corporate Finance (Fifth Edition; ISBN 9780205987252) teaches students how to build corporate finance models in Excel. It covers time value of money, firm and project valuation, capital structure, capital budgeting, financial planning, and real options. His Excel modeling books have been translated into Chinese and Italian.

He has published papers about teaching in FEN Educator and the Journal of Financial Education having created three courses in market microstructure at Indiana University:

- F335 Security Trading and Market Making at the undergraduate level
- F535 Security Trading and Market Making at the M.B.A. level
- F635 Market Microstructure at the doctoral level.
