= Wei Jiang =

American economist and professor

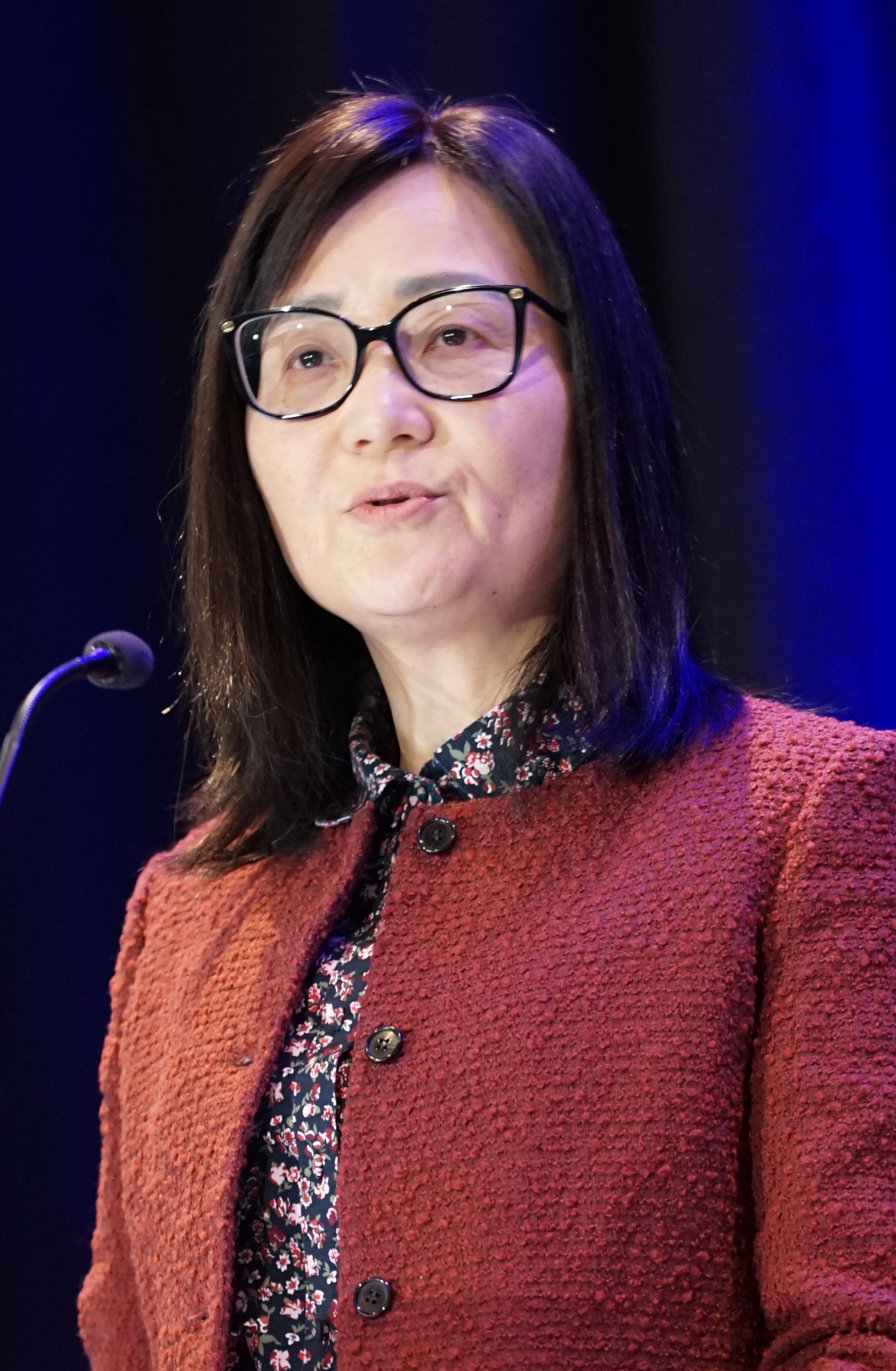
- Jiang at ASSA 2026

Academic background
- Education: Fudan University, University of Chicago

Academic work
- Discipline: Financial economics, Corporate governance
- Institutions: Emory University
- Notable ideas: Hedge fund activism, shareholder advocacy

Wei Jiang is an American economist who is currently the Asa Griggs Candler Professor of Finance and Vice Dean for Faculty and Research at Emory University's Goizueta Business School. Her research focuses on corporate governance, institutional investors, and the impact of technology on financial markets.

== Education ==
Jiang received her B.A. and M.A. in economics from Fudan University in 1992. She then attended the University of Chicago, where she earned her Ph.D. in economics in 2001.

== Career ==
Prior to joining Emory University in July 2022, Jiang was the Arthur F. Burns Professor of Free and Competitive Enterprise at Columbia Business School, where she also served as the Vice Dean for Curriculum and Instruction. She currently serves as the President of the American Finance Association (AFA) for the 2026 term.

Her research on hedge fund activism is widely cited and has been featured in major media outlets such as The Wall Street Journal and The Economist. She has served as the President of the Society for Financial Studies (SFS).

Jiang is also a Research Associate at the National Bureau of Economic Research (NBER) and a senior fellow at the Program on Corporate Governance at Harvard Law School.

== Selected publications ==
- Brav, A.; Jiang, W.; Partnoy, F.; Thomas, R. (2008). "Hedge fund activism, corporate governance, and firm performance". The Journal of Finance. 63 (4): 1729–1775.
- Jiang, W.; Li, K.; Wang, W. (2012). "Hedge funds and chapter 11". The Journal of Finance. 67 (2): 513–560.
- Cao, S.; Jiang, W.; Wang, J. L.; Yang, B. (2024). "From Man vs. Machine to Man + Machine: The Art and AI of Stock Analyses". Journal of Financial Economics. 154: 103792.
