= Eduardo Schwartz =

Chilean economist

Eduardo Saul Schwartz (born 1940) is a professor of finance at SFU's Beedie School of Business, where he holds the Ryan Beedie Chair in Finance. He is also a Distinguished Research Professor at the University of California, Los Angeles. He is known for pioneering research in several areas of finance, particularly derivatives. His major contributions include: the real options method of pricing investments under uncertainty; the Longstaff–Schwartz model - a multi-factor short-rate model; the Longstaff-Schwartz method for valuing American options by Monte Carlo Simulation; the use of Finite difference methods for option pricing.

He has been faculty at the University of British Columbia and UCLA, and visiting at the London Business School, the University of California, Berkeley and the Universidad Carlos III in Madrid. His wide-ranging research has focused on different dimensions in asset and securities pricing. Topics in recent years include interest rate models, asset allocation issues, evaluating natural resource investments, pricing Internet companies, the stochastic behaviour of commodity prices, valuing patent-protected R&D projects and optimal carbon abatement strategies.

He has published more than 100 articles in finance and economics journals and with Lenos Trigeorgis is an author of Real Options and Investment Under Uncertainty. He is the winner of a number of awards for both teaching excellence and for the quality of his published work. He has served as associate editor for over 20 journals, including Journal of Finance, Journal of Financial Economics and Journal of Financial and Quantitative Analysis. He is a past president of the Western Finance Association and the American Finance Association. He is a fellow of the American Finance Association and the Financial Management Association International. He is a research associate of the National Bureau of Economic Research.

He was awarded a Doctor Honoris Causa by the University of Alicante in Spain, by the Copenhagen Business School in Denmark, and by the Comillas Pontifical University in Spain, as well as a Catedra de Excelencia by the Universidad Carlos III in Madrid. He has also been a consultant to governmental agencies, banks, investment banks and industrial corporations.

Professor Schwartz received a B.Eng. (1963) in Industrial Engineering from the University of Chile, and an M.Sc. (1973) and Ph.D. (1975; supervisor: Michael Brennan) both in business administration from the University of British Columbia.
