= Hui Chen (economist) =

Economist

Academic background
- Education: Sun Yat-Sen University, University of Michigan, University of Chicago

Academic work
- Discipline: Finance, economics, machine learning
- Institutions: MIT Sloan School of Management, National Bureau of Economic Research

Hui Chen is the Nomura Professor of Finance and a Professor of Finance at the MIT Sloan School of Management and a research associate at the National Bureau of Economic Research. Hui Chen is a co-editor of the Annual Review of Financial Economics.

== Education ==
Chen has a B.A. in economics and finance from Sun Yat-Sen University (Zhongshan University, 2000), an M.S. in mathematics from the University of Michigan (2002), and a Ph.D. in finance from the University of Chicago (2007).

== Career ==
Chen is the Nomura Professor of Finance and a Professor of Finance at the MIT Sloan School of Management at Massachusetts Institute of Technology and a research associate at the National Bureau of Economic Research.

Chen has served on the board of the Macro Finance Society. He is a co-editor of the Annual Review of Financial Economics and an editor of the Review of Asset Pricing Studies.

== Research ==
Chen studies issues in asset pricing and corporate finance, including credit risk, financing, investment decisions, liquidity, and the macroeconomy. He applies business cycle models to corporate financing and corporate bond pricing. He combines machine learning methods with finance theory and uses machine learning to develop robust algorithms for credit risk forecasting models and protect them against strategic attacks. He is particularly interested in the behavior of Chinese financial markets.

== Awards ==
- 2024, Dimensional Fund Advisors Prize, Journal of Finance, American Finance Association
- 2019, North America Arthur Warga Award for Best Paper in Fixed Income, Society for Financial Studies
- 2011, Smith Breeden Prize, Journal of Finance, American Finance Association
