= Zhiguo He =

Chinese economist

Academic background
- Education: Tsinghua University; Northwestern University

Academic work
- Discipline: financial economics, macroeconomics
- Institutions: Stanford University

Chinese name
- Simplified Chinese: 何治国
- Hanyu Pinyin: Hé Zhìguó

Zhiguo He is a Chinese financial economist serving as the James Irvin Miller Professor of Finance at the Stanford Graduate School of Business since 2024. He is also a faculty research associate at the National Bureau of Economic Research, executive editor of Review of Asset Pricing Studies, member of the academy committee at the Luohan Academy, and special-term Alibaba Foundation Professor of Finance at Tsinghua University. He was previously a professor of finance at Chicago Booth School of Business. He earned his Ph.D. from the Kellogg School of Management at Northwestern University.

== Research ==
He’s research focuses on the implications of agency frictions and debt maturities in financial markets and macroeconomics, especially related to contract theory and banking. His most-cited paper “Intermediary Asset Pricing,” co-authored with Arvind Krishnamurthy, presents a model explaining financial crises in markets with complex securities such as mortgage-backed securities and corporate bonds. Complicating the traditional asset pricing literature, which considers financial intermediaries to be veils for household investors, this paper understands intermediaries to be marginal investors and offers a framework for understanding and evaluating government policies during such a financial crisis.

More recently, He has been studying rapidly developing Chinese financial markets and cryptocurrency. For example, “The Financing of Local Government in China: Stimulus Loan Wanes and Shadow Banking Waxes,” co-authored with Zhuo Chen and Chun Liu, attributes the rise of shadow banking around 2013 in China to a stimulus loan hangover effect that results from the four-trillion-yuan stimulus package in 2009 and draws parallels to a similar phenomenon in the US national banking era. His paper on cryptocurrency, “Decentralized Mining in Centralized Pools,” co-authored with L. William Cong and Jiasun Li, highlights that while risk sharing leads to the consolidation of mining pools, over-consolidation of mining pools is not a concern as long as miners can freely allocate their hash rates.

== Awards ==
In 2008, He received the Lehman Brothers Fellowship for Research Excellence in Finance and in 2014, he received a Sloan Research Fellowship. He has won both top paper prizes from the Journal of Finance: he won the Brattle Group First Prize in 2012 for his paper “Rollover Risk and Credit Risk,” co-authored with Wei Xiong, and again in 2021 for his paper “Leverage Dynamics without Commitment,” co-authored with Peter DeMarzo; he won the 2014 Amundi Smith-Breeden First Prize for his paper “A Theory of Debt Maturity: The Long and Short of Debt Overhang,” co-authored with Douglas Diamond. He was also named a Rising Star at Fordham University’s 2018 Rising Stars Conference.
