= Hannes F. Wagner =

German economist

Hannes F. Wagner is a German economist and finance academic. He is Full Professor of Finance at Bocconi University in Milan, Italy, and serves as Visiting Faculty at the National University of Singapore Business School (2025-2026). He is a Research Member of the European Corporate Governance Institute and a Fellow of the Innocenzo Gasparini Institute for Economic Research.

Wagner's research focuses on institutional investors, shareholder activism, corporate governance, and corporate social responsibility. His work has been published in leading finance journals including the Journal of Finance, Review of Financial Studies, and Journal of Financial Economics.

== Education ==
Wagner received his Bachelor and Master degrees in Business Economics from LMU Munich. He completed his PhD in Finance at the same institution in 2005, graduating summa cum laude. During his doctoral studies, he was a Visiting Doctoral Student at the University of Oxford's Saïd Business School.

== Career ==
Wagner joined Bocconi University in 2007 as Assistant Professor of Finance, was promoted to Associate Professor with tenure in 2013, and to Full Professor in November 2025. He has been a Fellow of the Innocenzo Gasparini Institute for Economic Research since 2009 and a Research Member of European Corporate Governance Institute since 2018. Starting in 2026, he will serve as Program Director for Bocconi's Master of Science in Finance – "Global Experience" program.

Prior to Bocconi, he held postdoctoral positions at the University of Oxford (2005-2006) and London Business School (2006-2007).

== Research ==
Wagner's research has focused on several areas of corporate finance and governance:

=== Notable Publications ===
His research on the Panama Papers, co-authored with James O'Donovan and Stefan Zeume and published in the Review of Financial Studies (2019), analyzed leaked data to study offshore secrecy structures. This work received the Michael J. Brennan Award Runner-Up for Best Paper Published in the Review of Financial Studies in 2020.

His work on shareholder activism includes "The Benefits of Access: Evidence from Private Meeting with Portfolio Firms" with Marco Becht and Julian Franks (forthcoming in the Journal of Finance), which won the WRDS Best Conference Paper Award in 2019, and "Returns to Hedge Fund Activism: An International Study" published in the Review of Financial Studies (2017), which received the CAMRI Prize in Asset Management in 2015.

His research on family firms includes "Does Family Control Matter? International Evidence from the 2008-2009 Financial Crisis" with Karl Lins and Paolo Volpin (Review of Financial Studies, 2013), which won the S.A.C. Capital Advisors Best Conference Paper Award at the European Finance Association Annual Meeting in 2012.

His work on ESG and sustainability includes "Do Institutional Investors Drive Corporate Social Responsibility? International Evidence" with Alexander Dyck, Karl Lins, and Lukas Roth (Journal of Financial Economics, 2019) and "Renewable Governance: Good for the Environment?" (Journal of Accounting Research, 2023), which won the Best Paper Award at the FMA Global Conference in Latin America in 2019.

== Awards and Recognition ==
Wagner has received multiple research awards including the WRDS Best Conference Paper Award (2019), the CAMRI Prize in Asset Management (2015), and the S.A.C. Capital Advisors Best Conference Paper Award from the European Finance Association (2012). He has also received multiple teaching awards at Bocconi University, including the 2022-2023 Graduate School Teaching Award and Annual Awards for Innovation in Teaching (2016, 2017).
