= American Finance Association =

Academic organization

- Abbreviation: AFA
- Formation: 1939
- President: Wei Jiang
- Website: www.afajof.org

The American Finance Association (AFA) is an academic organization whose focus is the study and promotion of financial economics. It was formed in 1939. Its main publication, the Journal of Finance, was first published in 1946.

== Mission ==
The purpose of the association is to:

- Act as a mutual association of persons with an interest in finance
- Improve the public understanding of financial problems
- Provide for the exchange of financial ideas through the distribution of the Journal of Finance and other media
- Encourage the study of finance in colleges and universities
- Conduct other activities appropriate for a non-profit, professional society in the field of finance

== Membership ==
The association offers regular and student memberships and describes its members as a worldwide community of researchers, students, educators, and practitioners interested in financial economics.

A number of members are also distinguished in the Society of Fellows of the Association. These are members who have made significant contributions to the field of finance.

== Administration ==
The administration of the association is overseen by both officers and a board of directors. All of these positions are held by faculty at various universities. The board of directors rotates over time and assists in key decisions and policies.

== Journal of Finance ==
The Journal of Finance is an academic journal that covers the whole field of finance. It began publication in 1946. According to Journal Citation Reports, it has a 2015 impact factor of 5.290. The current editor is Antoinette Schoar. The Journal of Finance, The Review of Financial Studies, and the Journal of Financial Economics are considered to be the top-three finance journals.

== Annual meeting ==
An annual meeting of the association is held every year in January, in conjunction with the American Economic Association and the North American Winter Meetings of the Econometric Society as a part of the Allied Social Science Associations. The president speaks on a selected topic and there are presentations of various financial papers. The AFA, Western Finance Association Meetings, and Society for Financial Studies Cavalcade are considered to be the three top general finance conferences in the world.

Recent Annual Meeting AFA sites:

- 2015 Boston, Massachusetts
- 2016 San Francisco, California
- 2017 Chicago, Illinois
- 2018 Philadelphia, Pennsylvania
- 2019 Atlanta, Georgia
- 2020 San Diego, California
- 2021 Virtual Annual Meeting
- 2022 Virtual Annual Meeting

== Past and current presidents of the AFA ==
The years listed reflect the year of service as President. The Presidential Address is typically delivered at the annual meeting held in January of the following year (e.g., the 2025 President delivers the address in January 2026).

- 1940 Kenneth Field
- 1941 Chelcie C. Bosland
- 1942 Charles L. Prather
- 1943 John D. Clark
- 1944 No President
- 1945 No President
- 1946 Harry G. Guthman
- 1947 Lewis A. Froman
- 1948 Benjamin H. Beckhart
- 1949 Neil H. Jacoby
- 1950 Howard R. Bowen
- 1951 Raymond J. Saulnier
- 1952 Edward E. Edwards
- 1953 Roland I. Robinson
- 1954 Garfield V. Cox
- 1955 Norris O. Johnson
- 1956 Miller Upton
- 1957 Marshall D. Ketchum
- 1958 Lester V. Chandler
- 1959 James J. O'Leary
- 1960 Paul M. Van Arsdell
- 1961 Arthur M. Weimer
- 1962 Bion B. Howard
- 1963 George T. Conklin Jr.
- 1964 Roger F. Murray
- 1965 George Garvy
- 1966 J. Fred Weston
- 1967 Robert V. Roosa
- 1968 Harry C. Sauvain
- 1969 Walter E. Hoadley
- 1970 Lawrence S. Ritter
- 1971 Joseph A. Pechman
- 1972 Irwin Friend
- 1973 Sherman J. Maisel
- 1974 John Lintner
- 1975 Myron J. Gordon
- 1976 Merton H. Miller
- 1977 Alexander A. Robichek
- 1978 Burton G. Malkiel
- 1979 Edward J. Kane
- 1980 William F. Sharpe
- 1981 Franco Modigliani
- 1982 Harry M. Markowitz
- 1983 Stewart C. Myers
- 1984 James C. Van Horne
- 1985 Fischer Black
- 1986 Robert C. Merton
- 1987 Richard Roll
- 1988 Stephen A. Ross
- 1989 Michael J. Brennan
- 1990 Myron S. Scholes
- 1991 Robert H. Litzenberger
- 1992 Michael C. Jensen
- 1993 Mark Rubinstein
- 1994 Sanford J. Grossman
- 1995 Martin J. Gruber
- 1996 Eduardo S. Schwartz
- 1997 Hayne E. Leland
- 1998 Edwin J. Elton
- 1999 Hans R. Stoll
- 2000 Franklin Allen
- 2001 George M. Constantinides
- 2002 Maureen O'Hara
- 2003 Douglas W. Diamond
- 2004 René M. Stulz
- 2005 John Y. Campbell
- 2006 Richard C. Green
- 2007 Kenneth R. French
- 2008 Jeremy C. Stein
- 2009 J. Darrell Duffie
- 2010 John H. Cochrane
- 2011 Raghuram G. Rajan
- 2012 Sheridan Titman
- 2013 Robert Stambaugh
- 2014 Luigi G. Zingales
- 2015 Patrick Bolton
- 2016 Campbell Harvey
- 2017 David Scharfstein
- 2018 Peter DeMarzo
- 2019 David Hirshleifer
- 2020 Kenneth Singleton
- 2021 John Graham
- 2022 Laura Starks
- 2023 Markus Brunnermeier
- 2024 Monika Piazzesi
- 2025 Ulrike Malmendier
- 2026 Wei Jiang

== Fellows of the American Finance Association ==
In January 2000, the Board of Directors of the American Finance Association instituted a Society of Fellows of the Association. The purpose of the society is to recognize those members who have made a distinguished contribution to the field of finance. Since Fellows are selected by the membership for their contributions to the field of finance, and since this is the principal criterion for election as president, all living past presidents and all future presidents of the association are designated as Fellows. The list of AFA Fellows contains all past presidents and the Fellows selected since that date. Each year, the Nominating Committee, chaired by the current president, solicits names from the membership and nominates a slate of no more than five candidates from which current Fellows elect one new Fellow. Polling of the current Fellows is carried out by the immediate past-president prior to the next annual meeting.

== Prizes and awards ==
=== Fischer Black Prize ===
Biennially, the association awards the Fischer Black Prize at its annual meeting. The award, named in honor of economist Fischer Black, recognizes an outstanding young academic whose original research has made a significant contribution to the field of finance.

=== Brattle Prizes ===
Annually, the Brattle Prizes are awarded annually for outstanding papers on corporate finance at its annual meeting.

=== Dimensional Fund Advisors Prizes ===
Annually, the association awards the Dimensional Fund Advisors Prizes (prizes prior to 2019 were sponsored by Amundi Pioneer, Amundi Smith Breeden, and Smith Breeden) for the top three papers in the Journal of Finance in any area other than corporate finance at its annual meeting.

=== Morgan Stanley-AFA Award for Excellence in Finance ===
The Morgan Stanley-American Finance Association Award for Excellence in Finance was a bi-annual finance award granted based on an individual's career achievements in outstanding thought leadership in the field of financial economics. The Award began in 2008 and continued for 5 bi-annual periods.
