= Lenos Trigeorgis =

Lenos Trigeorgis is the Bank of Cyprus Chair Professor of Finance in the School of Economics and Management, University of Cyprus. He is considered a leading authority on capital budgeting and strategy, having pioneered the field of real options, and having authored several books on related topics.

He has taught at universities including Boston University, MIT, Columbia University, UC Berkeley, London Business School, University of Chicago, and Durham University. He has published in numerous journals, and serves on the editorial boards of several journals. He is also President of the Real Options Group (ROG), a boutique strategy consulting firm focusing on real options valuation. Every year since 1997, ROG has organized the Annual International Conference on Real Options.

Prof. Trigeorgis is the author of Real Options (MIT Press, 1996) and co-authored Strategic Investment (Princeton University Press, 2004), and Competitive Strategy (MIT Press, 2012). With Michael Brennan, he edited Project Flexibility, Agency, and Competition (Oxford University Press, 1999), and, with Eduardo Schwartz, Real Options and Investment Under Uncertainty (MIT Press, 2001).

He received his D.B.A. from Harvard University in 1986.
