= Craig Holden =

Craig Holden may refer to:

- Craig Holden (footballer) (born 1957), Australian rules footballer
- Craig Holden (writer), American novelist and film producer
- Craig W. Holden (died 2021), American financial economist and professor
