= Marshall E. Blume =

American economist (1941–2019)

Marshall Edward Blume (31 March 1941 – 27 January 2019) was an American financial economist.

Blume studied mathematics at Trinity College and pursued postgraduate study in finance at the University of Chicago, where he completed a master's degree and doctorate (1968). In Chicago's doctoral program, he overlapped with Hans Stoll (PhD 1966), Richard Roll (PhD 1968), Michael C. Jensen (PhD 1968), and Myron Scholes (PhD 1969).

Blume was chief editor of the Journal of Finance from 1977 to 1980, and also served as an associate editor of the Journal of Financial Economics, The Journal of Portfolio Management, and The Journal of Fixed Income. He co-founded Prudent Management Associates in 1982. Blume taught at the Wharton School of the University of Pennsylvania for 44 years, beginning in 1968. While on the faculty, he created Wharton's Online Trading and Investment Simulator and the Wharton Securities Exchange. He was appointed Howard Butcher Professor of Finance in 1978, and granted emeritus status upon retirement in 2010. In 2011, the Rodney L. White Center for Financial Research, where Blume had served as director since 1986, began awarding the Marshall Blume Prizes in Financial Research in his honor. Blume died in Easton, Maryland, on 27 January 2019.
