= Martin J. Gruber =

American professor of financial economics, focusing on investments

- Born: 1937 (age 88–89)

Academic background
- Education: Massachusetts Institute of Technology (BS); Columbia University (MBA, PhD)

Academic work
- Discipline: Finance
- Institutions: New York University Stern School of Business
- Website: pages.stern.nyu.edu/mgruber/

Martin Jay Gruber is professor emeritus of finance and scholar in residence at the Stern School of Business, New York University, where he was previously Nomura professor of finance (1987-2010) and chair of the finance department (1989-1997).

He was elected president of the American Finance Association in 1995. He is director emeritus of the National Bureau of Economic Research, where he was on the investment committee.

His research studies mutual funds, pension funds, and expectations in the process of security price formation. He has been honored for his research by several academic and industry organizations

With Edwin Elton, he wrote Modern Portfolio Theory and Investment Analysis (Wiley), now in its 9th edition, a standard textbook in the field of modern portfolio theory.

== Early life and education ==
Gruber earned his Bachelor of Science degree in Chemical Engineering from the Massachusetts Institute of Technology in 1959. He then attended Columbia University, where he received an M.B.A. in Production Management in 1961 and a Ph.D. in Finance and Economics in 1966. His doctoral dissertation, titled Common Stock Valuation, was abstracted in the December 1966 issue of the Journal of Finance. During his graduate studies, he was a member of Beta Gamma Sigma and studied under a National Defense Education Act Fellowship.

== Academic career ==
Gruber joined the faculty of New York University's Graduate School of Business Administration in 1965 as an Assistant Professor of Finance. He was promoted to Associate Professor in 1968 and to full Professor in 1972. From 1972 to 1974, he took leave to serve as a Senior Research Fellow at the International Institute of Management in Berlin, Germany.

In 1987, Gruber was appointed the Nomura Professor of Finance at New York University's Stern School of Business, a position he held until 2010. He chaired the Finance Department from 1989 to 1997. Upon his retirement from full-time teaching in 2010, he was named Professor Emeritus of Finance and Scholar in Residence at Stern.

Gruber served as Vice President and Program Chairman of the American Finance Association in 1994 and was elected President of the association in 1995. He has been a Director of the National Bureau of Economic Research since 2005 and serves on its Executive and Investment Committees.

== Research ==
Gruber's research has spanned multiple decades and has made significant contributions to the fields of portfolio theory, mutual fund performance evaluation, asset pricing, and international finance. He has published extensively in leading academic journals, including the Journal of Finance, the Journal of Financial and Quantitative Analysis, Management Science, the Review of Financial Studies, and the Journal of Business.

=== Portfolio theory and asset pricing ===
Gruber has been a central figure in the development and refinement of modern portfolio theory. He co-authored Modern Portfolio Theory and Investment Analysis, now in its ninth edition and widely considered a foundational text in the field. His early work in the 1970s explored optimal portfolio selection criteria, including the development of simple ranking devices for portfolio construction and the implications of non-normal return distributions for portfolio optimization. He examined the multi-index case for portfolio selection, tracing out efficient frontiers under various constraints, and investigated the relationship between portfolio size and risk reduction.

With the introduction of the Arbitrage Pricing Theory (APT) by Stephen Ross in the 1970s, Gruber contributed to its empirical validation and practical application. His 1984 paper "On the Robustness of the Roll and Ross Arbitrage Pricing Theory" examined the stability of the APT framework, and he later explored its application in estimating the cost of capital for utilities and other industries. In a 2018 special issue of the Journal of Portfolio Management, Gruber reflected on the impact of Ross's exploration of APT on the field.

=== Mutual fund performance evaluation ===
Gruber has made extensive contributions to the study of mutual fund performance, addressing questions of persistence, survivorship bias, timing ability, and the behavior of fund investors. His 1996 paper "The Persistence of Risk-Adjusted Mutual Fund Performance," published in the Journal of Business, examined whether superior performance persists over time. That same year, his article "Survivorship Bias and Mutual Fund Performance" in the Review of Financial Studies demonstrated the importance of accounting for funds that drop out of databases when evaluating performance, influencing subsequent empirical work in the area.

In "Another Puzzle: The Growth in Actively Managed Mutual Funds" (1996), Gruber investigated why investors continue to allocate capital to actively managed funds despite evidence that, on average, they underperform passive benchmarks. This work helped initiate a broader literature on investor behavior and the demand for active management. His 2001 paper "A First Look at the Accuracy of the CRSP Mutual Fund Database and a Comparison of the CRSP and Morningstar Mutual Fund Databases" contributed to methodological improvements in empirical mutual fund research by documenting data quality issues and differences across major databases.

=== Closed-end funds and alternative investment vehicles ===
Gruber has studied a range of investment vehicles beyond traditional mutual funds. His work on closed-end funds, including "Why Do Closed-End Bond Funds Exist? An Additional Explanation for the Growth in Domestic Closed-End Bond Funds" (2013), provided new explanations for the persistence and growth of this vehicle, complementing the traditional closed-end fund puzzle literature. He also examined the performance of commodity funds, separate accounts, and collective investment trusts, broadening the understanding of performance across the institutional investment landscape.

=== Target date and target risk funds ===
In recent years, Gruber has turned his attention to defined contribution retirement plans and the funds designed for them. His 2015 article "Target Date Funds; Characteristics and Performance" and 2016 paper "Target Risk Funds" examined the design, allocation strategies, and performance of these popular retirement investment products. This work has important implications for pension economics and investor welfare, particularly as retirement savings increasingly shift toward participant-directed accounts.

=== Investor behavior and fund selection ===
Gruber has also investigated the behavior of mutual fund investors, including how they select funds and respond to available choices. His work on 401(k) plans examined the adequacy of investment choices and participant reactions to fund offerings. In "Are Investors Rational: Choices Among Index Funds" (2004), he explored whether investors make optimal decisions when selecting among index funds, contributing to the broader literature on investor rationality and choice architecture in retirement savings.

=== International finance and Japanese capital markets ===
Gruber has made contributions to the study of international capital markets, including work on international diversification, Japanese stock market behavior, and cross-border investment strategies. His book Japanese Capital Markets (1990) and his articles on the multi-index risk model of the Japanese stock market reflect his interest in understanding risk and return in non-U.S. markets. He has explored international portfolio management from various country perspectives, including Swiss, Spanish, and broader global contexts.

== Publications ==
He has written seven books and over 100 articles in scholarly journals, several with his longtime coauthor Edwin Elton.

His pre-1996 articles are collected in a book published by MIT Press, "Investments" in two volumes. His post-1996 articles are collected in a book published by World Scientific, "Investments and portfolio performance".

Among other editorships, he was editor of The Journal of Finance from 1983-1988.

== Honors ==
- Member, Investment Committee, National Bureau of Economic Research 2009
- Member, Executive Committee, National Bureau of Economic Research 2008
- Fellow, Institute for Quantitative Research 2006
- Director, National Bureau of Economic Research 2005
- James R. Vertin Award for lifetime achievement for producing a body of work with enduring value for Investment Professionals 2004
- President, American Finance Association 1996
- Fellow, American Finance Association
- Fellow Financial Management Association
- Fellow of the Institute for Quantitative Research in Finance
- Winner, Graham Dodd Award (1990)
- Winner, Award from Institute of Quantitative Analysts (1988)
- Winner, Award from Institute of Quantitative Analysis (1984)

== Personal life ==
He is the father of Jonathan Gruber, professor of health economics at MIT.
