= G. William Schwert =

American retired finance professor and editor

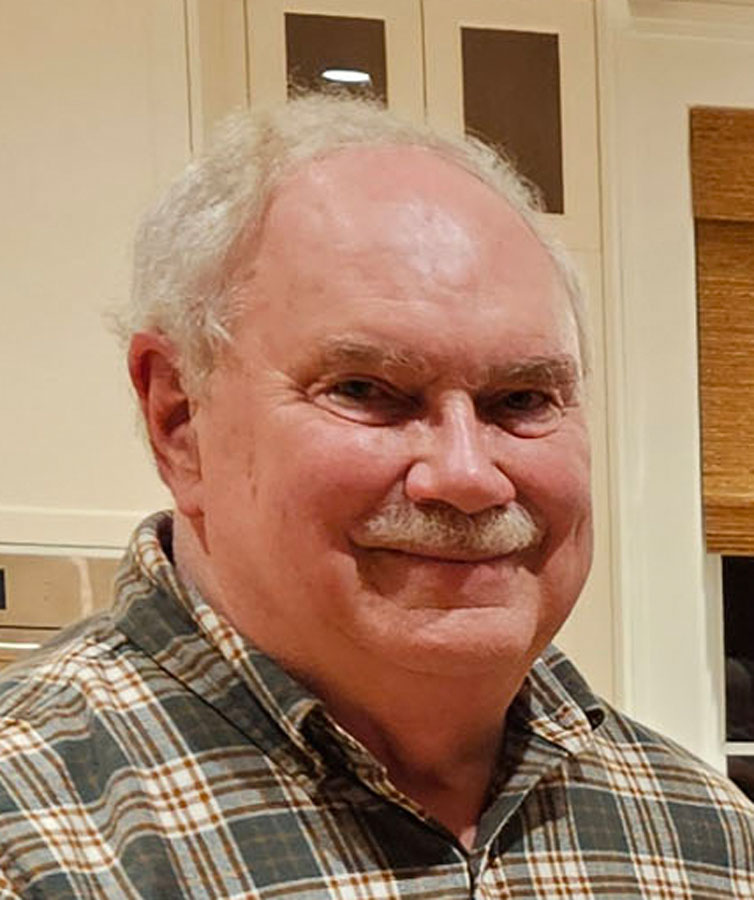
- Born: 1950 (age 75–76); Durham, North Carolina, U.S.
- Known for: Former managing editor of the Journal of Financial Economics

Academic background
- Education: Sayre School; Trinity College; University of Chicago Booth School of Business

G. William "Bill" Schwert is an American finance academic who is professor emeritus of business at the Simon Business School of the University of Rochester, where he taught from 1976 to 2021. He served as managing editor of the Journal of Financial Economics from 1996 to 2021 and has been an editor of the journal since 1979.

== Early life and education ==
Schwert was born in 1950 in Durham, North Carolina, and moved to Lexington, Kentucky, in 1959, when his father joined the newly established medical school at the University of Kentucky to help found its biochemistry department.

He attended Sayre School before earning a bachelor's degree with honors in economics from Trinity College in 1971. He then completed an MBA in 1973 and a PhD in 1975 at the University of Chicago Booth School of Business.

== Career ==
Aside from one year as an assistant professor at Chicago, he spent his entire career at Rochester's Simon School before being granted professor emeritus status in 2021. In 1998, he was named Distinguished University Professor of Finance and Statistics. From 1996-2021, he was managing editor of the Journal of Financial Economics.

He was appointed a research associate of the National Bureau of Economic Research in 1988, named a Fellow of the Financial Management Association, and elected a Fellow of the American Finance Association.

== Personal life ==
Schwert is married and has three children and three stepchildren. He has nine grandchildren.

== Research ==
Schwert's research spans finance, economics, and econometrics, with work on asset pricing, time series econometrics, stock market volatility, corporate governance, and initial public offerings. His publications have received over 40,000 citations according to Google Scholar.

His early work on inflation and asset returns includes the article "Asset Returns and Inflation" (1977), coauthored with Eugene Fama in the Journal of Financial Economics, which documented a negative relationship between stock returns and nominal interest rates.

With Charles Plosser, Schwert published several papers on time series econometrics and the behavior of economic variables with unit root properties. His 1987 paper in the Journal of Business and Economic Statistics was later selected as one of the journal’s most influential early articles.

In the late 1980s, Schwert became known for his research on stock market volatility. His article "Why Does Stock Volatility Change Over Time?" (1989) in the Journal of Finance examined volatility using historical financial data and received the Smith–Breeden Distinguished Paper Prize. His 1990 article "Stock Market Volatility" in the Financial Analysts Journal received the Graham and Dodd Award.

In the 1990s, he studied the market for corporate control, including a 1995 Journal of Financial Economics article with Robert Comment on poison pills and takeover defenses.

In the 2000s, his research focused on initial public offerings. His 2004 Journal of Financial Economics article with Michelle Lowry on IPO pricing won the Jensen Prize.
