= Paul Woolley =

Paul Woolley may refer to:

- Paul Woolley (economist) (born 1939), British economist
- Paul Woolley (historian) (1902–1984), American professor of Church history
- Paul V. Woolley (1881–1949), American physician and military officer
