= David Hirshleifer =

American economist

- Born: California

Academic background
- Education: University of Chicago; University of California, Los Angeles

Academic work
- Discipline: Financial economics Behavioral economics
- Institutions: USC Marshall School of Business
- Notable ideas: Information cascades theory; theory of investor under- and over-reactions
- Awards: Smith Breeden Award, 1999 for outstanding paper in the Journal of Finance
- Website: Information at IDEAS / RePEc

David Hirshleifer is an American economist who is currently the David G. Kirby Professor of Behavior Economics at the University of Southern California Marshall School of Business. From 2006 to 2021 he was a Distinguished Professor of Finance and Economics at the University of California, Irvine, where he also held the Merage Chair in Business Growth. From 2018 to 2019, he served as President of the American Finance Association, and is an associate at the NBER. Previously, he was a professor at UCLA, the University of Michigan, and Ohio State University. His research is mostly related to behavioral finance and informational cascades. In 2007, he was listed as one of the 100 most-cited economists in the world by Web of Science. On Google Scholar, he has more than 60,000 citations.

== Background ==
David's father, Jack Hirshleifer, was an economics professor at UCLA from 1960 to 2001. He is married to Siew Hong Teoh, a chaired professor of accounting at the University of California at Los Angeles. He was an editor of the Journal of Finance from 2003 to 2011. He was also an editor of the Review of Financial Studies from 2001 to 2007, and executive editor of the RFS from 2011 to 2014. From 2020 to 2021, he was a co-editor of the Journal of Financial Economics.

He was educated at UCLA, where he received a BA in mathematics in 1980, and at the University of Chicago, where he received an MA in economics in 1983, and a PhD in economics in 1985.

== Research ==
Hirshleifer's research areas include the modeling of social influence, theoretical and empirical asset pricing, and corporate finance. He is the originator of the theory of information cascades, and has modeled investor psychology and its effects on security market under- and over-reactions. His scholarly work on cascades has also received attention from popular economics, with references in both mainstream business and economics media. He is a contributor to the fields of behavioral economics and behavioral finance.

Much of his work on investor psychology has focused on the effects of biased self-attribution, overconfidence, and limited attention. He and his co-authors were awarded the 1999 Smith Breeden Award for research showing how investor overconfidence, in combination with biased self-attribution, can explain the short-run momentum (finance) and long-run reversal patterns found the returns of many stock markets. More recent work has shown how investor overconfidence may also help explain the forward premium puzzle in foreign exchange markets . In his work on limited attention, he has shown that both distracting events and lack of attention to relevant information can help explain important accounting anomalies such as post earnings announcement drift

Hirshleifer's research has taken several approaches to show that stock returns are not exclusively based on relevant financial information, but also incorporate factors such as investors' mood and superstitions. His paper "Good Day Sunshine: Stock Returns and the Weather," found abnormally high returns in the New York Stock Exchange composite on days that it was abnormally sunny in the New York city area. His research on the Chinese initial public offering market has provided evidence that Chinese companies which contain listing code numbers considered lucky in Chinese culture are initially priced much higher than financially similar Chinese firms debuting with unlucky numbers in their listing codes.

In addition to investor psychology, Hirshleifer also examines behavior of different parties in financial market. His work with Usman Ali developed a method to identify insider tradings for a firm, which can be used to predict this firm's opportunistic behavior such as earnings management, restatements, SEC enforcement actions, shareholder litigation, and executive compensation. This paper is later reported by Justin Lahart on Wall Street Journal. His research, "Psychological Bias as a Driver of Financial Regulations", argued that regulator psychology plays an important role in financial markets. This research has garnered attention as the F2008 financial crisis led to greater a scrutiny about the process of setting financial regulation.

== Books ==
Together with his father, Jack Hirshleifer, and the economist Amihai Glazer, Hirshleifer is the coauthor of the microeconomics textbook Price Theory and Applications: Decisions, Information, and Markets.

== Selected publications ==
- Hirshleifer, Jack; Glazer, Amihai; Hirshleifer, David (2005). Price theory and applications: Decisions, markets, and information (7 ed.). Cambridge University Press. ISBN 978-0-521-52342-4.
- Bikhchandani, Sushil; Hirshleifer, David; Welch, Ivo (1992). "A Theory of Fads, Fashion, Custom, and Cultural Change as Informational cascades". Journal of Political Economy. 100 (5): 992–1026. doi:10.1086/261849. S2CID 7784814.
- Daniel, Kent; Hirshleifer, David; Subrahmanyam, Avanidhar (1998). "Investor Psychology and Security Market Under- and Overreactions". Journal of Finance. 53 (6): 1839–1885. doi:10.1111/0022-1082.00077. hdl:2027.42/73431. S2CID 32589687.
- Hirshleifer, David (2001). "Investor psychology and asset pricing" (PDF). Journal of Finance. 56 (4): 1533–1597. doi:10.1111/0022-1082.00379.
- Bikhchandani, Sushil; Hirshleifer, David; Welch, Ivo (1998). "Learning from the behavior of others: Conformity, fads, and informational cascades". The Journal of Economic Perspectives. 12 (3): 151–170. doi:10.1257/jep.12.3.151. hdl:2027.42/35413.
- Hirshleifer, David; Shumway, Tyler (2003). "Good day sunshine: Stock returns and the weather". Journal of Finance. 58 (3): 1009–1032. doi:10.1111/1540-6261.00556.
