= JFE =

JFE may refer to:

- JFE Holdings, a Japanese conglomerate
- JFE Just Fiction! Edition, an imprint of the German group VDM Publishing
- Journal of Financial Economics
