= Repositioning =

Repositioning may refer to:

- Adjusting the positioning of a product, brand or company
- Affirmative Repositioning, a leftist political movement in Namibia
- Drug repositioning, the application of known drugs to treat new diseases
- Equity repositioning, a diversifying financial strategy
- Repositioning cruise, a cruise in which the embarkation and the disembarkation ports are different
- Repositioning maneuver, an epley maneuver used to treat benign paroxysmal positional vertigo
