= Guttentag =

Guttentag may refer to

- Dobrodzień, a town in Poland
- Bill Guttentag (born 1958), American film writer, producer and director
- Jack M. Guttentag (1923–2024), American academic, professor emeritus of finance
