= Richard C. Green =

American economist

Richard Carleton Green (April 26, 1953 – October 9, 2015) was an American financial economist, the Richard M. and Margaret S. Cyert Chair and Professor of Financial Economics at the Tepper School of Business at Carnegie Mellon University. His research interests were in the areas of taxation and asset pricing. He was previously an editor of the Journal of Finance and the only economist to be president of all three leading financial economics scholarly societies: The American Finance Association (2006), Western Finance Association (1999–2000) and Society for Financial Studies (2012–2013). A former Pomona College student, he died in Pittsburgh, Pennsylvania.
