= Whited =

Whited is a surname. Notable people with the surname include:

- Ed Whited (born 1964), American baseball player
- Marvin Whited (1918–1957), American football offensive guard
- Mike Whited (born 1958), American football player
- Toni Whited, American professor

== See also ==
- Whited Township, Kanabec County, Minnesota, United States
- Whited Inlet, inlet of Antarctica
