= Calamity House =

Real estate term

A Calamity House, locally referred to as "hongza" or "Xiōngzhái" (凶宅), is a real estate term used in Hong Kong to describe a home where someone has died. The concept of hongza does not necessarily require a haunting, as in the case of a western-style haunted house. The designation of hongza is legally required to be disclosed by realtors or other property dealers.

The term hongza is derived from the Cantonese word hong, meaning violence, murder, or calamity; and za meaning residence, home, or house.

== History ==
In 1977, the Hong Kong Buildings and Lands Department created a governmental database on unusual deaths and murders in apartment buildings, and this list can now be accessed via Hong Kong's Lands Department.

In 2004, as part of the Law Reform Commission, Judge Benjamin Yu ruled against the estate agency Centaline Property Agency, for not disclosing the hongza status of one of their properties in 2001. The agency was fined $40,000 for not obtaining information in relation to the properties.

== Cultural Relevance ==
During the Cultural Revolution in mainland China, there were campaigns designed to reduce superstition within the masses. The dead were held at home before funerals, destigmatizing the dead. However, Hong Kong did not experience the same governmental campaigns. This, combined with their population's relative isolation, created a cultural pocket that retained a superstitious fear of death.

In 2020, Utpal Bhattacharya published an article in Review of Finance that found that not only do hongza disclosures negatively affect pricing on their own property, but can affect other units in the same building or even neighboring buildings.

The Economist found that 898 out of 1.1M real estate transactions between 2000 and 2015 were hongza disclosed properties, and had an average of 20% reduction on their price, with murder sites in particular receiving a 36% reduction. Despite the lower pricepoint, the cultural aversion to hongza properties still makes selling or renting these units difficult, and realtors will resort to selling to mainland Chinese clients or even foreigners.

Websites sell hongza data to realtors or offer hongza data to the public. In either instance, however, listings may not be specific to apartment units, or even floors, and may inadvertently list the full property, affecting pricing within the entire property, not just the unit where the death has occurred. Hongza listings are also permanent, and a property cannot be removed from these databases, however the impact frequently reduces after a time.
