= Matthew Richardson (economist) =

American economist

Academic background
- Education: University of California at Los Angeles, Stanford University

Academic work
- Discipline: Finance, economics
- Institutions: Wharton School of the University of Pennsylvania., New York University, National Bureau of Economic Research

Matthew Richardson is the Charles E. Simon Professor of Applied Economics and Professor of Finance in the Finance Department at the Leonard N. Stern School of Business of New York University (NYU), New York, United States. He is also the Director of Alternative Investments at the Salomon Center for the Study of Financial Institutions at NYU. and a Research Associate of the National Bureau of Economic Research. Richardson is a co-editor of the Annual Review of Financial Economics.

Richardson has co-edited or co-authored four books on the 2008 financial crisis and the modernization of insurance regulations: Restoring Stability: How to Repair a Failed System (2009), Regulating Wall Street: The Dodd-Frank Act and the New Architecture of Global Finance (2010), Guaranteed to Fail: Fannie Mae, Freddie Mac and the Debacle of Mortgage Finance (2011) and Modernizing Insurance Regulation (2014).

== Education ==
Richardson received both his B.A and M.S. in Economics concurrently from the University of California at Los Angeles in 1984. He received his Ph.D. in finance from the Graduate School of Business at Stanford University in 1989.

== Career ==
Richardson was previously at the Wharton School of the University of Pennsylvania. Richardson joined the Leonard N. Stern School of Business of New York University in 1995. He has been the Sidney Homer Director of the Salomon Center for the Study of Financial Institutions at NYU, He is the Charles E. Simon Professor of Applied Economics and Professor of Finance in the Finance Department at the Leonard N. Stern School of Business of New York University (NYU).

== Impersonation ==
In 2004, Richardson was apparently inadvertently impersonated by a British University of Oxford engineering undergraduate by the same name, who took up an offer to perform a series of lectures in Beijing. The student used an A-level t textbook to "blag" through two days of lectures before fleeing from his Chinese audience and interpreter.
