= Maureen O'Hara (financial economist) =

American economist

- Education: Northwestern University Kellogg School of Management (Ph.D.); Northwestern University (M.A.); University of Illinois (B.S.)
- Known for: Market microstructure
- Scientific career
- Fields: Financial economics
- Workplaces: Cornell Johnson Graduate School of Management at Cornell University (1979–)

Maureen Patricia O'Hara is an Irish-American financial economist. O'Hara is the Robert W. Purcell Professor of Management, and professor of finance at the Cornell Johnson Graduate School of Management at Cornell University. She has won numerous awards and grants for her research, served on numerous boards, served as an editor for numerous finance journals, and chaired the dissertations of numerous students. In addition, she is well known as the author of the books Market Microstructure Theory and Something for Nothing: Arbitrage and Ethics on Wall Street. She was the first female president of the American Finance Association. She has been awarded honorary doctorates from three European universities.

== Research ==
O'Hara's research focuses on issues in market microstructure, and she is the author of Market Microstructure Theory as well as numerous journal articles. Her most recent research has focused on high frequency market microstructure, bond market microstructure, the impact of transparency on trading system performance, fractional shares, prediction markets, machine learning and microstructure, block chains and cryptocurrencies, and the role of liquidity and information risk in asset pricing. She also works on issues in finance and ethics with her most recent book being Something for Nothing: Arbitrage and Ethics on Wall Street.

In addition, O'Hara publishes widely on a broad range of topics including banking and financial intermediaries, law and finance, and experimental economics. Among O'Hara's numerous awards are the Journal of Portfolio Management Quant Researcher of the Year (2023), CFA Institute's James R. Vertin Award (2020), Institutional Investor Trading Technology 40 (2014), the American Finance Association 2000 Smith-Breeden Distinguished Paper Award for "When the Underwriter is the Market Maker: An Examination of Trading in the IPO Aftermarket" (with Katrina Ellis and Roni Michaely), 2002 Smith-Breeden Distinguished Paper Award for "Is Information Risk a Determinant of Asset Returns?" (with David Easley, and Soeren Hvidkjaer), and 2003 Smith-Breeden Distinguished Paper Award for "Presidential Address: Liquidity and Price Discovery." Prof. O'Hara is a co-inventor of the VPIN Flow Toxicity metric.

== Positions held ==
O'Hara was the executive editor of the Review of Financial Studies (1999–2005). She has served as president of the Western Finance Association, the American Finance Association, the Financial Management Association, and the International Atlantic Economics Association, O'Hara is on the board of the Jeffrey Company and is a trustee of the NBER (National Bureau of Economic Research). She was on the Board of trustees of TIAA and a director of New Star Financial. She has also served as board chair of Investment Technology Group, Inc. (ITG). She has consulted for a number of companies and organizations, including Microsoft, Merrill Lynch, Credit Suisse First Boston, Facebook, the New York Stock Exchange, Bristol-Myers Squibb, and the World Federation of Exchanges. O'Hara is or has been an advisor to Symbiont, Ava Labs and BMLL Technologies Ltd.

O'Hara has been a faculty member at Johnson, serving as an assistant professor from 1979 to 1984, associate professor from 1985 to 1988 and full professor since 1989. She has held visiting faculty appointments at UCLA, the London Business School, the University of New South Wales, the Hong Kong University of Science and Technology, Cambridge University and the University of Technology Sydney. She earned her BS in economics from the University of Illinois in 1975, her MS in economics in 1976, and her PhD in finance from Northwestern University in 1979.

== Selected publications ==
- Easley, D. and O'Hara, M. "Price, Trade Size, and Information in Securities Markets." Journal of Financial Economics, 19, 1987.
- O'Hara, M. "Market Microstructure Theory", John Wiley & Sons, 1998.
- Easley, D. and O'Hara, M. "Information and the Cost of Capital." Journal of Finance, Vol. 59, No. 4, August, 2004.
- Easley, D., O'Hara M. and Yang, L. “Differential Access to Price Information in Financial Markets.” Journal of Financial and Quantitative Analysis, 51(4), 1071 -1111, 2016. (Winner of the W. F. Sharpe Award, 2016)
