= Myron Gordon =

Myron Gordon may refer to:

- Myron Gordon (biologist) (1899–1959), American ichthyologist
- Myron J. Gordon (1920–2010), American economist
- Myron L. Gordon (1918–2009), American federal judge
