= Jack Hirshleifer =

American economist (1925–2005)

Jack Hirshleifer (August 26, 1925 – July 26, 2005) was an American economist and long-time professor at the University of California, Los Angeles.

He received a B.S. in 1945 and a Ph.D. in 1950 from Harvard University. He worked at the RAND Corporation in Santa Monica from 1949 to 1955. He then taught at the University of Chicago from 1955 to 1960, and at UCLA until 2001. Hirshleifer was well known for his work on uncertainty and information in economics, the economic analysis of conflict, and bioeconomics. His undergraduate textbook, Price Theory and Applications, went into seven editions. A 1958 article by Hirshleifer began the triumphant comeback of Irving Fisher's theory of capital and interest, now deemed canonical. While at the RAND Corporation, Hirshleifer wrote a report which tore apart the Department of Water and Power's feasibility report for the Oroville Dam, noting among other things that the report failed to include the cost of building the dam. The dam ended up being built. (Cadillac Desert, Chapter 10).

== Bibliography ==
- Hirshleifer, Jack (1970). Investment, Interest, and Capital, Prentice/Hall International
- Hirshleifer, Jack (June 1973). "Exchange Theory: The Missing Chapter." Western Economic Journal (Economic Inquiry) 11: 129–146
- Hirshleifer, Jack (1976). Price Theory and Applications, Prentice/Hall International
  - Hirshleifer, Jack; Glazer, Amihai; Hirshleifer, David (2005). Price theory and applications: Decisions, markets, and information (7 ed.). Cambridge University Press. ISBN 9780521523424.
- Hirshleifer, Jack (January 1983). "From weakest-link to best-shot: The voluntary provision of public goods", Public Choice, Vol. 41, Number 3, pp. 371–386.
- Hirshleifer, Jack (1994). The Analytics of Uncertainty and Information. Cambridge: Cambridge University Press
- Hirshleifer, Jack (2001). The dark side of the force: economic foundations of conflict theory. Cambridge: Cambridge University Press
