= Siew Hong Teoh =

Professor in America

Siew Hong Teoh is the Lee and Seymour Graff Endowed Professor of accounting at UCLA Anderson School of Management. She is on the editorial board of the Accounting Review and the Review of Accounting Studies.

== Career ==
Professor Teoh obtained a BSC (1st class hons.) and MSc in economics from the London School of Economics. She then pursued an MBA and PhD at the Graduate School of Business at the University of Chicago. Her first position was as an assistant professor at UCLA and then the business school of the University of Michigan.She was then promoted to associate professor, and then full professor at the Fisher College of Business at Ohio State University. From 2006-2021, she was on the University of California-Irvine Paul Merage School of Business faculty, where Teoh was the Dean's Professor of Accounting. She is currently the Lee and Seymour Graff Endowed Professor of accounting at UCLA Anderson School of Management.

== Research ==
Her research interests are mainly focused on information and capital markets, and span both accounting and finance. She studies how accounting information affects firm stakeholders such as managers or investors. Her research also tries to understand how the timing of information disclosure to investors affects firms, their values and stakeholders.

Her most cited article in the Journal of Finance studies how during Initial Public Offerings (IPOs), some issuing companies manage earnings by reporting higher accruals. This makes the companies look more successful than they actually are and can impact the outcome of an IPO. The article reports that the companies that are more aggressive at boosting earnings per share have lower long-run returns.

In another widely cited paper in the Journal of Finance, she looks at CEO overconfidence. The paper finds that companies with overconfident CEO (according to proximate metrics) invest more in innovation. They also obtain more patents and patent citations. On the negative side, they suffer from greater return volatility.

Her research has been cited more than 32,000 times and she is the 145th most cited female economist according to RePEC. Her research has been cited in Forbes, Bloomberg and Der Spiegel.
