= Utpal Bhattacharya =

American academic

Utpal Bhattacharya is a finance professor at the Hong Kong University of Science and Technology. He is known for his research on market integrity, especially on insider trading.

In 2000, his research paper "When an Event is Not an Event" uncovered the rampant insider trading on Mexican stock markets. This led to many questions about the value and the enforceability of insider trading laws. Later, in "The World Price of Insider Trading" he discovered the fact that insider trading laws in themselves are not effective – they only start being effective once there is credible enforcement. Additionally he could "put a price on honesty", i.e. quantify the advantage of insider trading laws and the price of "window dressing" of company earnings.

As of May 2015, he is a professor of finance in Hong Kong University of Science and Technology (HKUST). Before his time at HKUST, Bhattacharya has been teaching at Columbia University, University of Iowa and Indiana University. He teaches in a different country every summer. He has taught at top universities in Argentina, Brazil, China, France, Germany, Holland, India, Indonesia, Italy, Japan, Mexico, New Zealand, Portugal, Singapore, Slovenia, South Korea, Russia, Taiwan, Turkey and the USA (Duke University, MIT and University of Chicago Booth School of Business).

He received his undergraduate degree in mechanical engineering from IIT Kanpur in 1980, an MBA from IIM Ahmedabad in 1982, and a Ph.D. degree from Columbia University in 1990.

== Publications (selection) ==
- "Insiders, Outsiders, and Market Breakdowns" (with Matthew Spiegel), The Review of Financial Studies, 1991, vol 4, 255–282
- "When an Event is Not an Event: The Curious Case of an Emerging Market" (with Hazem Daouk, Brian Jorgenson and Carl-Heinrich Kehr), Journal of Financial Economics, 2000, vol 55, 69–101
- "The World Price of Insider Trading" (with Hazem Daouk),Journal of Finance, 2002, vol 57, 75–108
- "The World Price of Earnings Opacity" (with Hazem Daouk and Michael Welker), The Accounting Review, 2003, vol 78, 641–678
- "Penny Wise, Dollar Foolish: Buy-Sell Imbalances on and Around Round Numbers" (with Craig Holden and Stacey Jacobsen), Management Science, 2012, Vol 15, 413–431
- "Conflicting Family Values in Mutual Fund Families" (with Jung Hoon Lee and Veronika Krepely Pool), Journal of Finance, 2013, vol 68, 173–200
