= Peter DeMarzo =

American economist

Peter M. DeMarzo is an American economist. On August 1, 2024, he became the interim Dean of the Stanford Graduate School of Business when Jonathan Levin left the Dean's position to become President of Stanford University.

He was educated at the University of California, San Diego. Upon graduating with a bachelor's degree in 1984, DeMarzo pursued graduate study at Stanford University, finishing his master's degree and doctorate in 1984 and 1989, respectively. DeMarzo began teaching at the Kellogg School of Management in 1989, and remained on the faculty at Northwestern University through 1997. Between 1995 and 1997, he was a visiting assistant professor at Stanford, after which he secured an associate professorship at the Haas School of Business of the University of California, Berkeley. He returned to Stanford in 2000, and was later appointed to the Mizuho Financial Group Professorship of Finance, followed by the Staehelin Family Professorship of Finance. DeMarzo was appointed president of the American Finance Association for the 2019 term.
