= Paul V. Woolley =

American physician and military officer

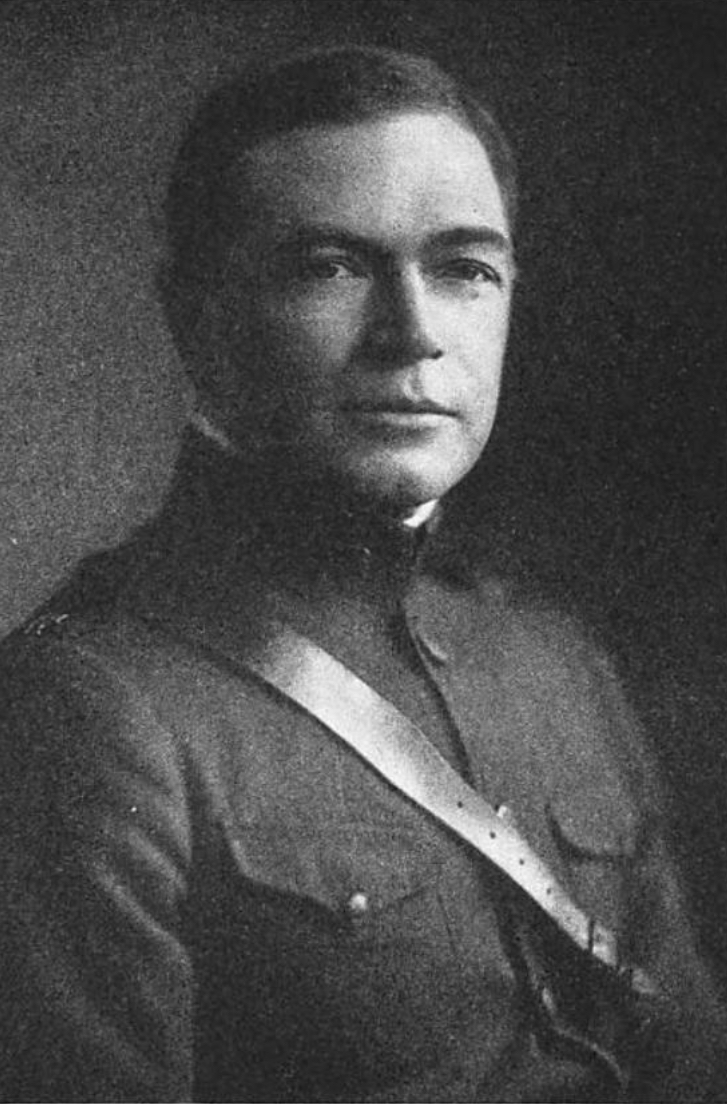
- Wolley in a 1921 publication
- Born: March 7, 1881; White County, Indiana, US
- Died: May 4, 1949 (aged 68); Pomona, California, US
- Alma mater: Kansas City Medical College
- Military career
- Allegiance: United States
- Branch: United States Army; Medical Reserve Corps
- Service years: 1917–1920
- Rank: Major
- Units: 15th Engineer Battalion; 19th Division
- Conflicts: World War I; Forest of Argonne offensive
- Other work: Physician

Paul Vincent Woolley (March 7, 1881 – May 4, 1949) was an American physician and military officer who served in World War I.

== Early life and education ==
Woolley was born on March 7, 1881, in White County, Indiana, to physician Martin Newell and Mary Woolley (née Ford). They moved to Colony, Kansas in 1883, Lipscomb, Texas in 1888, Upland, California in 1892, returning to Lipscomb in 1898. He received his education from schools in Lipscomb and Upland, and by age seventeen, was hired to hospitals. He later moved to Kansas City, Missouri, where he studied at Kansas City Medical College—graduated in 1905 with a Doctor of Medicine—and worked at St. Joseph Medical Center. On June 5, 1907, he married Meroe Royston Moies, having two children together.

== Military and career ==
In March 1917, Woolley enlisted as a first lieutenant, as a physician of the United States Army during World War I, becoming the first Kansas City physician to do so. He was among the first 29 physicians sent overseas during the war. He was stationed at American Base Hospital No. 5, in France. He was promoted to captain in September 1917 and was assigned to the 15th Engineer Battalion, then was transferred to become the urologist of the 19th Division in August 1918, when the 15th were stationed to Liffol-le-Grand. He served during the Forest of Argonne offensive. He was promoted to major in December 1918, and returned to the United States on May 20, 1919, being discharged in Fort Sheridan, Illinois.

After Wolley's return, he continued his medical work in Kansas City, namely urology. He worked at Saint Luke's Hospital of Kansas City and Saint Mary's Hospital, among other places, as well as being chief surgeon of the McCleary Sanitarium in Excelsior Springs. He was also an active member of multiple Kansas City clubs. He died on May 4, 1949, aged 68, in Pomona, California, during a vacation there.
