= George Constantinides =

American economist

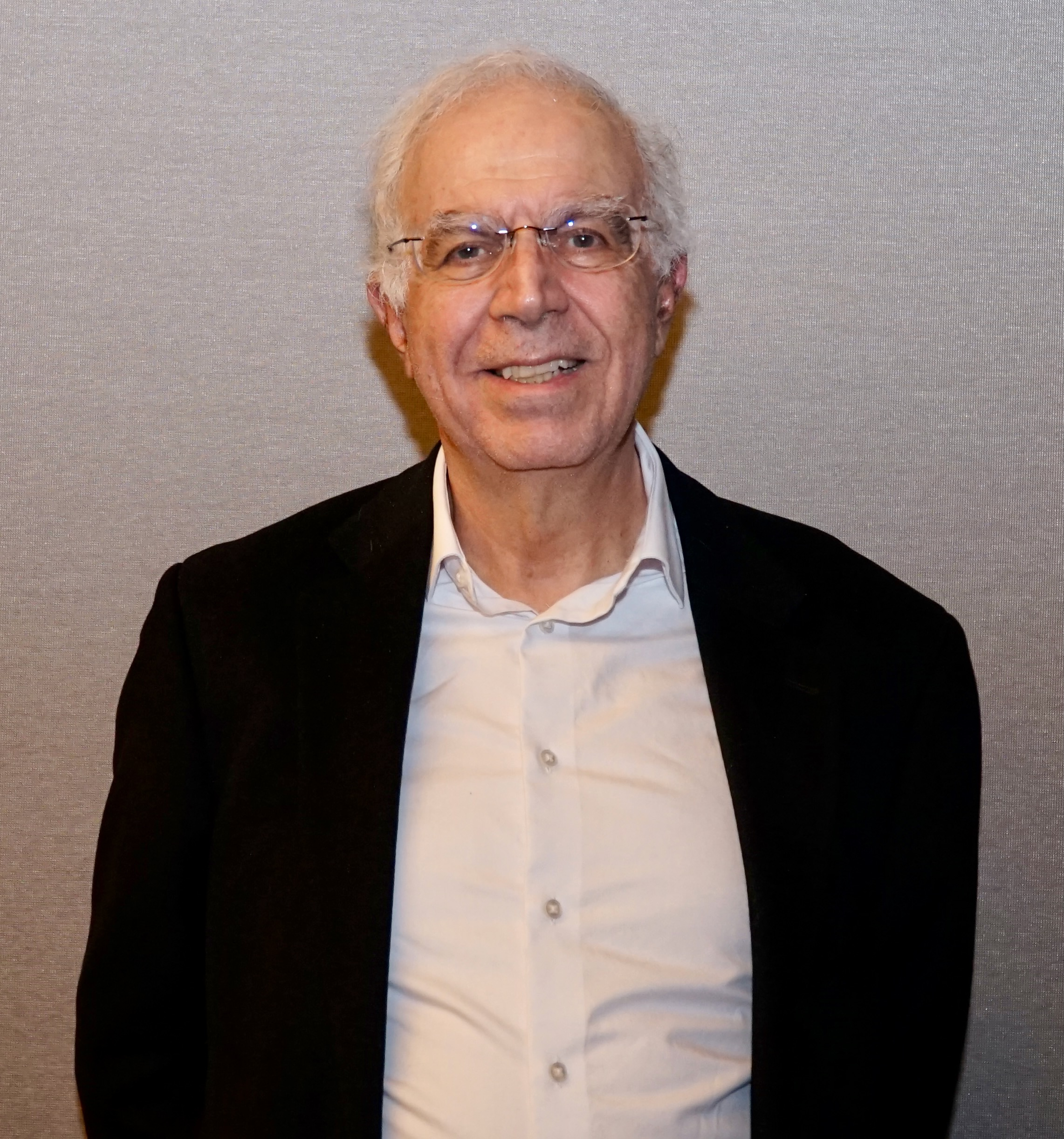
- Born: September 22, 1947 (age 79); Nicosia, Cyprus

Academic background
- Education: Indiana University; Oxford University

Academic work
- Discipline: Financial economics
- School or tradition: Chicago school of economics
- Institutions: University of Chicago
- Website: Information at IDEAS / RePEc

George M. Constantinides is a financial economist, known for his work on portfolio management, asset pricing, derivatives pricing, and capital markets behavior. He is the Leo Melamed Professor of Finance at the University of Chicago Booth School of Business and a board member of Dimensional Fund Advisors.

== Education ==
Constantinides earned a BA degree in physics from Oxford University in 1970. He came to the US on a Fulbright travel grant and received an MBA degree in 1972 and a Doctorate in Business Administration in 1975, both from Indiana University.

== Career ==
Constantinides began his career as an assistant professor at Carnegie Mellon University. He came to the University of Chicago in 1978 as the Ford Foundation Visiting assistant professor. There Constantinides was granted associate professor in 1979 and Professor in 1983, where he remains today. He was the Marvin Bower Fellow at Harvard Business School from 1985 to 1986 and the BP Visiting Professor at the London School of Economics in 2007.

A complete list of works is available at IDEAS. As examples, George Constantinides has made significant contributions to understanding the equity premium puzzle through various models and collaborations, such as incomplete markets, rare events, and internal habit models, paving the way for a multifaceted understanding of this financial phenomenon.

== Titles ==
Constantinides is a former president, vice-president, and director of the American Finance Association. He is also a former president, vice-president, and founding member of the Society for Financial Studies. Constantinides has been a research associate of the National Bureau of Economic Research since 1989. He has been the editor-in-chief of Foundations and Trends in Finance since 2004.

According to Research Papers in Economics, Constantinides ranks within the top 5% of authors based on numerous criteria.
