= Hans Stoll =

German-American economist and markets researcher (1939–2020)

Hans Reiner Stoll (December 11, 1939, in Regensburg, Germany - March 20, 2020, in Nashville, TN) was the Anne Marie and Thomas B. Walker, Jr. Professor of Finance and Director of the Financial Markets Research Center at Vanderbilt University's Owen Graduate School of Management.

Stoll is credited with the first description in the "modern" literature of the put–call parity option pricing relationship ("The Relationship between Put and Call Option Prices"). He was also an important academic contributor to the study of market microstructure. He has published several books and more than 60 articles, and is, or has been, associate editor of several finance journals.

He came to Vanderbilt in 1980 from the Wharton School of the University of Pennsylvania where he had been a faculty member since 1966, and has held various other faculty positions as visiting professor or scholar. He served on various government and industry advisory panels. He has been a director of the Financial Management Association and the Institute for the Study of Security Markets, and was president of the American Finance Association. Stoll was a visiting professor at the Board of Governors of the Federal Reserve System in 1968–69.

He received his A.B. in economics (1961) from Swarthmore College, and his MBA (1963) and Ph.D. (1966) from the University of Chicago. In 2007, he received an honorary doctorate from Goethe University, Germany.
