= Craig Holden (writer) =

American writer and film producer

- Education: University of Montana (MFA, 1986)
- Occupations: Novelist, film producer
- Years active: 1994–present
- Notable work: Four Corners of Night, The River Sorrow, The Jazz Bird
- Awards: Great Lakes Book Award in Fiction (1999)

Craig Holden is an American novelist and film producer based in the U.S. Southwest. He is known for crime, mystery, and thriller fiction. His third novel, Four Corners of Night (1998), won the 1999 Great Lakes Book Award in Fiction and appeared on the USA Today bestseller list. He has published six novels with major publishers including Delacorte Press and Simon & Schuster, and has served as executive producer and producer on award-winning short films.

== Early life and education ==
Holden was born in Toledo, Ohio, in 1959. He attended the University of Toledo for his undergraduate studies, graduating in 1983 with a B.A. degree with honors in a combined major in psychology, biology, and philosophy. He earned his Master of Fine Arts degree in Fiction from the University of Montana between 1984 and 1986. Following graduation, he moved to New York City, where he worked for two literary agencies and eventually became a film rights agent. He later relocated to Las Cruces, New Mexico, where he has lived and worked for many years.

== Literary career ==
=== Early novels ===
In 1989, facing financial pressures, Holden began writing what he initially intended as a quick commercial novel. Drawing on his earlier experience as a medical lab assistant, he wrote a detective thriller centered on a doctor in crisis. The project evolved into a more serious literary work over four years, resulting in The River Sorrow, which sold to Delacorte Press in 1993 and was published in 1994. The novel received coverage in major national outlets upon publication, including reviews in the Los Angeles Times and the Houston Chronicle. The novel was subsequently translated into a dozen languages.

Delacorte Press published Holden's second novel, The Last Sanctuary, in 1996. The thriller follows a Persian Gulf War veteran who becomes entangled in murder and an FBI investigation while attempting to help his substance-abusing brother; the novel was described by The New York Times as "a tightly wound thriller" whose "deftly realized characters" are drawn into "a shady nether world of cults and militias.” His third novel, Four Corners of Night (1998), explores the relationship between two police officers investigating a kidnapping case. The novel won the 1999 Great Lakes Book Award in Fiction, appeared on the USA Today bestseller list and several regional bestseller lists, and was reviewed in The Globe and Mail and the Kalamazoo Gazette.

=== Later works ===
Simon & Schuster published Holden's next three novels. The Jazz Bird (2002) is a historical novel based on the real 1920s George Remus murder trial in Cincinnati, set against the backdrop of bootlegging and Jazz Age culture. The novel was reviewed by both Cincinnati newspapers upon publication, and received coverage in The Globe and Mail.

== Film production ==
In 2016, Holden served as executive producer of the short film Yochi, written and directed by Ilana Lapid. Shot in Belize and addressing wildlife trafficking, the film has been used for conservation education across the Caribbean and Central America. Yochi won Best Short Film at the Belize International Film Festival in November 2016.

In 2022, Holden produced the short film Truck Fishing in America with writer-producer Neal Adelman, directed by Shelley DeLaney. The film has received multiple festival honors, including an Outstanding Achievement Award (Indie Short) at the IndieX Film Festival in 2023.

== Teaching and other activities ==
Holden has taught creative writing at the University of Toledo, the University of Michigan, and New Mexico State University in Las Cruces, New Mexico. He and his family have settled in the desert community of Las Cruces, where he has continued to write and participate in the region's literary scene. He currently serves as Assistant Vice President of Development at Texas Tech University Health Sciences Center El Paso, working in El Paso while residing in nearby Las Cruces.

Holden is a member of the advisory committee of the Plaza Classic Film Festival in El Paso, Texas.

== Bibliography ==
=== Novels ===
- The River Sorrow (1994)
- The Last Sanctuary (1996)
- Four Corners of Night (1998)
- The Jazz Bird (2002)
- The Narcissist's Daughter (2005)
- Matala (2008)

=== Filmography ===
- Yochi (2016) – executive producer
- Truck Fishing in America (2022) – producer

== Awards and honors ==
- Great Lakes Book Award in Fiction for Four Corners of Night (1999)
