= Toni Whited =

American economist

Toni Marion Whited
- Born: Reno, Nevada

Academic background
- Education: University of Oregon; Princeton University

Academic work
- Discipline: corporate finance
- Institutions: The University of Michigan

Toni Whited is an American financial economist who is the Heutwell Professor of Economics at the University of Michigan, a research associate at the National Bureau of Economic Research and editor-in-chief of the Journal of Financial Economics.

== Early life and education ==
Whited was raised in Reno, Nevada. She received her B.A. in economics and French from the University of Oregon in 1984 and received her PhD in economics from Princeton University in 1990, sponsored by the National Science Foundation Graduate Research Fellowship . Her dissertation was supervised by Ben Bernanke . She is fluent in English, French and Spanish and conversational in Russian.

== Career ==
Whited began her career at the Federal Reserve Board and held positions as a finance professor at the University of Iowa, University of Wisconsin, the University of Rochester and the University of Michigan.

Whited has published over 40 articles in economics and finance journals covering subjects such as corporate investment, corporate cash policy, structural estimation, corporate diversification, and econometric solutions. She is best known for her work on measurement error and tobin's q. Previously, she served as president of the Western Finance Association.

Whited has taught a variety of courses, and is known for her semi-annual summer school teaching structural estimation in corporate finance at the University of Pennsylvania funded by the Rodney L White Center for Financial Research.

== Selected awards ==
- Brattle Prize nomination, Journal of Finance, 2001
- Journal of Finance Brattle Prize for Outstanding Corporate Finance Paper, 2005.
- Journal of Finance Brattle Prize for Distinguished Corporate Finance Paper, 2007.
