= Annual International Conference on Real Options =

The Annual International Conference on Real Options: Theory Meets Practice is a yearly conference organized by the Real Options Group in cooperation with various top universities. Its stated aim is to "bring together academics and practitioners at the forefront of real options and investment under uncertainty to discuss recent developments and applications."

The conference has taken place in a different location every year since its inception in 1997. Notable keynote speakers have included Robert C. Merton of Harvard University, Myron Scholes of Stanford University, Robert Pindyck and Stewart Myers of MIT, and Stephen A. Ross of Yale.

In 2008, the conference was held in Rio de Janeiro, Brazil; in 2009, it was held in Portugal and Spain; in 2010, it was held in Rome, Italy; and in 2011, it was held in Turku, Finland.
