= Michael Brennan (finance) =

British-American economist and academic (1942–2026)

Michael J. Brennan (November 14, 1942 – September 11, 2026) was a British-American economist and academic who was an emeritus professor of finance at the UCLA Anderson School of Management, and previously a professor at the London Business School. He co-designed the Brennan-Schwartz interest rate model and was a pioneer of real options theory. His writings have been published extensively.

Brennan's research interests covered real options, asset pricing, corporate finance, derivative securities, market microstructure, and the role of information in capital markets. He was a president of the American Finance Association, and served as editor of the Journal of Finance, and was the founding editor of the Review of Financial Studies; the Michael Brennan Award is named for him. Brennan was a founding partner and director of the Real Options Group since its inception. He served as consultant to businesses and governments in the US and Canada.

He held a B.Phil. in Economics (1964) from Oxford University, an MBA (1967) from the University of Pittsburgh and a Ph.D. in business (1970) from the MIT Sloan School of Management. Brennan was awarded a number of honorary doctorates, including Doctor of Laws from the University of Notre Dame in 2011 and by University College Dublin in 2016.

Brennan died on September 12, 2026, at the age of 83.

== Selected publications ==
- Brennan, M.J., The Role of Learning in Dynamic Portfolio Decisions, European Finance Review, 1, 295-306 (1998).
- Brennan, M.J. and Torous, W.N., Individual Decision Making and Investor Welfare, Economic Notes, 28, 2, 119-143 (July 1999).
- Brennan, M.J., Chordia, T. and Subrahmanyam, A., Alternative Factor Specifications, Security Characteristics, and the Cross-Section of Expected Stock Returns, Journal of Financial Economics, 49, 3, 345-373 (September 1998).
- Brennan, M.J. and Franks, J.R., Underpricing, Ownership and Control in Initial Public Offerings of Equity Securities in the UK, Journal of Financial Economics, 45, 391-413 (September 1997).
