= Jack M. Guttentag =

American academic (1923–2024)

Jack Guttentag
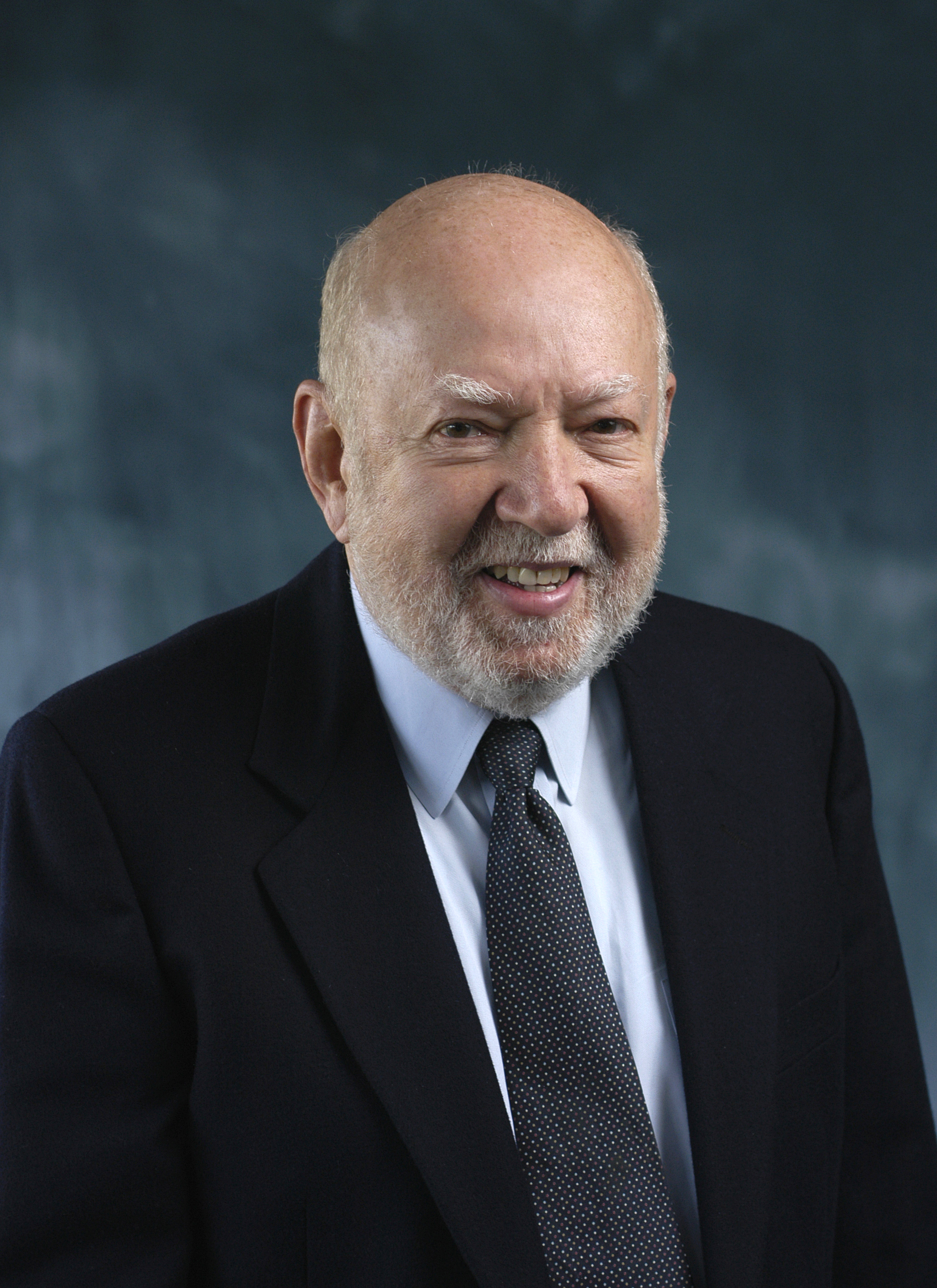
- Born: John Mack Guttentag; December 9, 1923; Brooklyn, New York, U.S.
- Died: February 6, 2024 (aged 100); Gladwyne, Pennsylvania, U.S.
- Education: B.S. from Purdue University; M.S. and Ph.D. from Columbia University
- Occupation: Professor of Finance
- Employer: Wharton School of the University of Pennsylvania

Jack Mack Guttentag (December 9, 1923 – February 6, 2024) was an American banker and academic who was a professor of finance at the Wharton School of the University of Pennsylvania. He was also a consumer advocate and creator of The Mortgage Professor, a website that provides free and disinterested advice to consumers on mortgage-related issues.

== Background ==
Jack Mack Guttentag was born in Brooklyn, New York, on December 9, 1923. He received his B.S. from Purdue University, and his M.S. and Ph.D. from Columbia University.

Guttentag died in Gladwyne, Pennsylvania, on February 6, 2024, at the age of 100.

== Career ==
=== At Wharton ===
Guttentag was a member of the Wharton faculty from 1962 until his death. He held positions as the Robert Morris Professor of Banking and the Jacob Safra Professor of International Banking. In 1996 he was appointed professor emeritus. He also served as co-director of the International Housing Finance Program at the Samuel Zell and Robert Lurie Real Estate Center.

Guttentag’s research included the reform of financial institutions, financial markets, and central banking institutions; innovations in monetary policy, real estate finance, housing economics, and commercial banking; and the restructuring of bank practices and lending procedures for the Federal Reserve, insurance firms, pensions groups, and savings and loan associations, including the design of unique mortgage instruments.

=== Consumer advocacy ===
In 1985, Guttentag co-founded GHR Systems, Inc., with Wharton professor E. Gerald Hurst. GHR Systems developed an electronic network to deliver complex mortgage information quickly to loan officers, mortgage brokers, and consumers. GHR Systems was acquired by Metavante in 2005.

After becoming emeritus at the Wharton School, Guttentag developed the website The Mortgage Professor to help consumers navigate the home loan market more effectively. He has published several books on the topic, including The Pocket Mortgage Guide (2003) and The Mortgage Encyclopedia (2004, 2010). He also wrote a nationally syndicated newspaper column on mortgages titled “Ask the Mortgage Professor”.

Guttentag developed three categories of certification for loan providers. The Upfront Mortgage Broker (UMB) certification was established in 2000 for brokers who agree to do business in accordance with a specific set of principles and standards. The Upfront Mortgage Brokers Association (UMBA) was created in 2001 to conduct monitoring and other functions. Guttentag served as the chairman of the board for UMBA.

In 2006 Guttentag established the Upfront Mortgage Lender (UML) certification to distinguish mortgage lenders who practice complete price disclosure on their websites without requiring shoppers to disclose their identity.

In 2012 the Certified Network Lenders (CNL) certification was established for mortgage lenders willing to provide complete pricing and underwriting agreements to The Mortgage Professor website.

=== Reverse mortgages ===
Starting in early 2014, Guttentag began focusing significant attention on the reverse mortgage market in the U.S., specifically the HUD sponsored HECM Reverse Mortgage program. In addition to offering a reverse mortgage shopping service on his website, Guttentag published extensive critiques of the HECM program from both a consumer and public policy standpoint.

=== Retirement planning ===
Concerned that adoption of reverse mortgages was low and that the product was primarily used as a "last resort" by retirees with no other options, Guttentag began development of a system that would maximize the potential of reverse mortgages. Working with Allan Redstone, they developed an analytical system called the Retirement Funds Integrator that attempts to maximize a lifetime stream of income derived from a combination of a retiree's financial assets and the equity in their home. Guttentag wrote extensively on this topic in his Forbes column and on his Mortgage Professor website.

=== Other work ===
Prior to joining the Wharton School Faculty, Guttentag was the Chief of the Domestic Research Division of the Federal Reserve Bank of New York, and part of the senior staff of the National Bureau of Economic Research. He served as the managing editor of The Journal of Finance from 1974 to 1977 and of The Housing Finance Review from 1983 to 1989. After becoming emeritus, he also worked as a consultant to many government agencies and private financial institutions.
