= René M. Stulz =

American economist

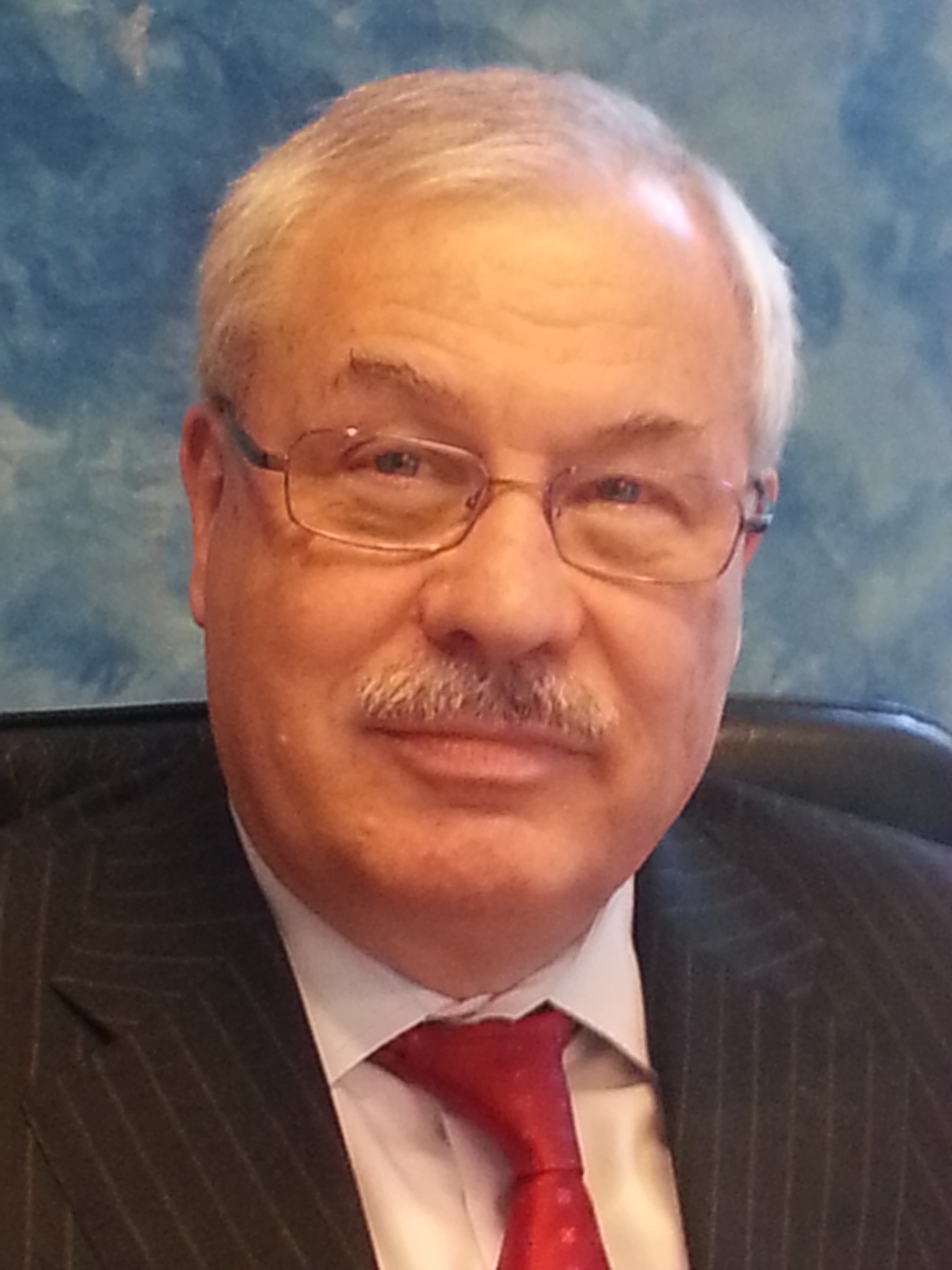
René Stulz (2014)

René M. Stulz is a professor of finance at the Fisher College of Business at the Ohio State University, where he has been on the faculty since 1983. After earning his undergraduate degree at the University of Neuchâtel in Switzerland, he earned his Ph.D. in economics at the Massachusetts Institute of Technology in 1980 and has taught at a variety of universities including the University of Rochester, the University of Chicago, Harvard University, Northwestern University, and the University of Southern California. He has published over 100 articles in finance and economic journals on topics ranging from corporate finance, corporate governance, asset pricing, financial institutions, and risk management, which have been cited over 120,000 times. Remarkably, his rate of publication in top peer-reviewed academic journals has not slowed down, more than 40 years after he started publishing.

Stulz was elected President of the American Finance Association for 2004.

One of his most influential articles is "Why Do U.S. Firms Hold So Much More Cash than They Used To?" The article documents that many publicly traded firms have increased the amount of cash on their balance sheets because their cash flows are more uncertain than was once the case.

Stulz served as an editor of the Journal of Financial Economics from 1982 to 1987 and the managing editor of the Journal of Finance from 1988 to 2000. As editor of the Journal of Finance, Stulz dramatically improved the journal's competitive position, publishing articles that attracted wide readership. In 1988, the 2-year Social Sciences Citation Index (SSCI) Impact Factor of the Journal of Finance (JF) was slightly below 1.5, less than half the Impact Factor of the Journal of Financial Economics (JFE), at 3.4. The Impact Factor measures how many times an average article published in the prior two years gets cited, and is a widely used measure of the influence of a journal. In 9 out of 10 years from 1980 to 1989, the JFE Impact Factor was more than twice that of the JF. From 1991 to 1998, in each year the JF and JFE Impact Factors were roughly the same.
