= Richard S. Ruback =

American economist

- Education: University of Rochester
- Occupation: Economist
- Known for: Willard Prescott Smith Professor of Corporate Finance at Harvard Business School

Richard S. Ruback is an American economist currently the Willard Prescott Smith Professor of Corporate Finance at the Harvard Business School. He previously taught at the MIT Sloan School of Management. He earned his PhD from the University of Rochester.
