= Paul Woolley (economist) =

British economist (born 1939)

Paul Kerrison Woolley (born 9 November 1939) is a British economist. He was educated at King Edward's School, Birmingham, and obtained a D. Phil from the University of York. Woolley worked for the fund management firm GMO, retiring as Chairman of GMO Europe in 2006. He then founded the Paul Woolley Centre for the Study of Capital Market Dysfunctionality at the London School of Economics in 2007.
