= Equity repositioning =

Equity Repositioning is the financial strategy of taking an equity rich asset base and repositioning those assets into a diversity of investment vehicles. The idea is to borrow against the equity value of a property and reposition that capital. This strategy is aimed at earning a rate of return greater than the cost to borrow the funds.

Equity is the monetary value of a property or business beyond any amounts owed on it in mortgages, claims, liens, etc. Repositioning means to place or put something in a new position; to position again.
