= The Journal of Business =

- Discipline: Business
- Language: English

Publication details
- Former name(s): Journal of Business of the University of Chicago, University Journal of Business
- History: 1928–2006
- Publisher: University of Chicago Press for the University of Chicago Booth School of Business (United States)
- Frequency: Bimonthly

Standard abbreviations
- ISO 4: J. Bus.

Indexing
- ISSN: 0021-9398
- JSTOR: 00219398
- OCLC no.: 1605755

Links
- Journal homepage; Online access

The Journal of Business was an academic journal published by the University of Chicago Press. It aimed to cover "a comprehensive range of areas, including business finance and investment, money and banking, marketing, security markets, business economics, accounting practices, social issues and public policy, management organization, statistics and econometrics, administration and management, international trade and finance, and personnel, industrial relations, and labor."

Originally titled The Journal of Business of the University of Chicago when it debuted in 1928, the journal shortened its name to The Journal of Business in 1954.

Its broad scope became a liability as specialization in business scholarship grew and numerous specialized journals appeared. Rather than keeping it as a generalist journal or narrowing its focus, the faculty of the University of Chicago's Booth School of Business decided to cease publication of the journal at the end of 2006.

Some of its issues are now freely available at JSTOR.
