= Society for Financial Studies =

Finance academic society

The Society for Financial Studies (SFS) is a nonprofit, academic society in the field of finance. It owns and runs three academic journals: (1) the Review of Financial Studies, (2) the Review of Asset Pricing Studies, and (3) the Review of Corporate Finance Studies. It organizes the SFS Cavalcade North America and the SFS Cavalcade Asia-Pacific, which are annual academic conferences. It financially supports and co-sponsors many independent finance academic conferences. Its governing board is the SFS Council.

== History ==
The Society for Financial Studies was incorporated as a nonprofit corporation in California in 1987. Its initial purpose was to own and run a new academic journal, which was called the Review of Financial Studies (RFS). The founding officers of SFS were Joseph Williams (President), George Constantinides (Vice President), and Mark Weinstein (Secretary/Treasurer). The founding editor of the Review of Financial Studies was Michael Brennan. The founding publisher was Oxford University Press, which has continued to publish RFS up to the present day.

== Academic journals ==
=== Review of Financial Studies ===
The Review of Financial Studies is an academic journal that covers the field of finance. It began publication in 1988 with 18 regular research articles spread out over 4 quarterly issues. In 2019, it published 123 regular research articles spread out over 12 monthly issues. According to Journal Citation Reports, it has a 2019 citation impact factor of 4.975. It is one of the top-three academic journals in finance, along with the Journal of Finance (ISSN 1540-6261) and the Journal of Financial Economics (ISSN 0304-405X). Its past issues are archived by JSTOR. The current editorial team is Itay Goldstein (Executive Editor), Lauren Cohen, Ralph Koijen, Holger Mueller, Manju Puri, Philip Strahan, and Stijn Van Nieuwerburgh.

=== Review of Asset Pricing Studies ===
The Review of Asset Pricing Studies is an academic journal that covers the finance sub-field of asset pricing. It began publication in 2011. It is published by Oxford University Press. In 2019, it published 10 articles in two issues. It has an unofficial citation impact factor of 1.063 based on the same methodology as Journal Citation Reports. The current editorial team is Jeffrey Pontiff (Executive Editor), Hui Chen, Nikolai Roussanov, and Thierry Foucault.

=== Review of Corporate Finance Studies ===
The Review of Corporate Finance Studies is an academic journal that covers the finance sub-field of corporate finance. It began publication in 2012. It is published by Oxford University Press. in 2019, it published 11 articles in two issues. It has an unofficial citation impact factor of 1.938 based on the same methodology as Journal Citation Reports. The current editorial team is Andrew Ellul (Executive Editor), Isil Erel, Gregor Matvos, and Uday Rajan.

== Conferences ==
=== SFS Cavalcade North America ===
The SFS Cavalcade North America is an annual academic conference held in North America covering the field of finance. The inaugural Cavalcade in 2011 was hosted by the Ross School of Business at the University of Michigan with a program that contained 42 papers. The 2019 Cavalcade North America was hosted by the Tepper School of Business at Carnegie Mellon University with a program that contained 135 papers. The conference chairs were Antoinette Schoar (Chair), Monika Piazzesi (Vice Chair), Ulrike Malmendier (Associate Chair), and Josef Zechner (SFS Advisory Chair). According to a comparison of 45 academic finance conferences by Reinartz and Urban (2017), "The Society for Financial Studies (SFS) Finance Cavalcade conference is the best large finance conference according to subsequent publication rates in TOP3 finance journals." The 2020 Cavalcade North America will be hosted by the University of North Carolina at Chapel Hill and the 2021 Cavalcade North America will be hosted by the McCombs School of Business at the University of Texas at Austin.

=== SFS Cavalcade Asia-Pacific ===
The SFS Cavalcade Asia-Pacific is an annual academic conference to be held in Asia-Pacific covering the field of finance. The inaugural Cavalcade Asia-Pacific in 2017 was hosted by PBC School of Finance at Tsinghua University in Beijing, China. The 2019 Cavalcade Asia-Pacific was hosted by the University of Hong Kong in Hong Kong, China with a program that contained 60 papers. The conference chairs were Kalok Chan (Chair) and Jun-Koo Kang (Vice Chair).

== Council and Member Communications ==
The SFS Council is the governing board of SFS. It includes three SFS officers, a council chair, and several councilors. The SFS officers are Laura Starks (President), Josef Zechner (Vice President), and Craig Holden (Secretary/Treasurer). The council chair is Raman Uppal. The councilors are Renee Adams, Alon Brav, Allaudeen Hameed, Kai Li, Tarun Ramadorai, and Karin Thorburn. SFS holds an annual membership meeting each year at the SFS Cavalcade North America. At that meeting, the SFS officers, SFS journal executive editors, and the SFS Cavalcade Chair report on SFS activities to the membership.
