= Western Finance Association =

The Western Finance Association (WFA) is an international professional society for academicians and practitioners with a scholarly interest in the development and application of research in finance.

Its purpose is:

- to serve as a focal point for communication among members,
- to improve teaching and scholarship, and
- to provide for the dissemination of information, including the holding of meetings and the support of publications.

The Western Finance Association meeting, American Finance Association meeting, and Society for Financial Studies Cavalcade are considered to be the three top general finance conferences in the world.

The society's inaugural meeting was held in August 1965 at the annual convention of the Western Economic Association (WEA). More than 200 members were enrolled during the first year, 430 by the end of the second year. Officers elected were Kenneth L. Trefftzs (University of Southern California), President; Edward W. Reed (University of Oregon), Vice President and Omer L. Carey (Washington State University), Secretary-Treasurer. Its current President is Josef Zechner (Vienna University of Economics and Business) and past Presidents include Toni Whited, Douglas Diamond, Richard C. Green, Ravi Jagannathan, Sheridan Titman, and Dr. Lemma Senbet (founder of Lemma Senbet Fund).
