= Antoinette Schoar =

German-American economist

- Education: University of Chicago
- Scientific career
- Fields: Finance
- Workplaces: MIT Sloan School of Management
- Doctoral advisor: Sherwin Rosen

Antoinette Schoar is a German-American economist, currently the Stewart C. Myers-Horn Family Professor of Finance and Entrepreneurship at the MIT Sloan School of Management.

== Education and career ==
Schoar received her Diploma in Economics from the University of Cologne in 1995 and received her Ph.D. in economics from the University of Chicago in 2000, advised by Sherwin Rosen. In 2000, she joined MIT as an assistant professor in finance and became a full professor in 2008. She has served on the inaugural advisory board of the Consumer Financial Protection Bureau.

Aside from her academic career and her time at the Consumer Financial Protection Bureau, Schoar is also a co-founder of ideas42, a non-profit that uses research done in behavioral economics and psychology in order to solve various social problems. Through ideas42, Schoar is able to combine her expertise in entrepreneurship and academia.

== Research ==
Together with Marianne Bertrand, Antoinette Schoar has investigated the effect of managers on firm policies in the U.S., finding that a large share of differences between firms' investment, financial, and organizational practices are due to differences in their managers and, more importantly, their management style, with older managers generally being more conservative and managers with MBA degrees being generally more aggressive in terms of corporate decisions. In work with Bertrand and David Thesmar, Schoar observes that after the deregulation of banking in France in 1985, banks became less willing to bail out firms with poor performance and firms being more dependent on banks became more likely to restructure, with rising rates of job and asset reallocation, higher allocative efficiency, and a less concentrated banking sector, an observation in line with Schumpeterian processes of creative destruction. Schoar and Bertrand have also conducted research on the role of family for family enterprises, finding that family values tend to be associated with lower economic development - though differently than trust - and more family firms, are fairly stable over time, don't react much to economic changes, and don't appear to reflect weak formal institutions. In further research on this topic in Thailand with Simon Johnson and Krislert Samphantharak, Schoar and Bertrand find family involvement in the ownership of family businesses to increase in family size, though firm performance decreases the more the founders' sons become involved, possibly because of a "race to the bottom" wherein, fearing the dilution of ownership and control over the business group, the descendants attempt to tunnel resources out of the group's firms.

== Recognition ==
In 2021 she was named a Fellow of the Econometric Society.

== Selected publications ==
- Kaplan, S.N., Schoar, A. (2005). Private equity performance: Returns, persistence, and capital flows. Journal of Finance, 60(4), pp. 1791–1823.
- Schoar, A. (2002). Effects of corporate diversification on productivity. Journal of Finance, 57(6), pp. 2379–2403.
- Lerner, J., Schoar, A. (2005). Does legal enforcement affect financial transactions? The contractual channel in private equity. Quarterly Journal of Economics, 120(1), pp. 223–246.
- Lerner, J., Schoar, A., Wongsunwai, A. (2007). Smart institutions, foolish choices: The limited partner performance puzzle. Journal of Finance, 62(2), pp. 731–764.
- Afonso, G., Kovner, A., Schoar, A. (2011). Stressed, not frozen: The federal funds market in the financial crisis. Journal of Finance, 66(4), pp. 1109–1139.
