= Annual Review of Financial Economics =

- Discipline: Financial economics
- Language: English
- Edited by: Hui Chen and Matthew P. Richardson

Publication details
- History: 2009–present, 17 years old
- Publisher: Annual Reviews (US)
- Frequency: Annually
- Open access: Subscribe to Open
- Impact factor: 4.1 (2025)

Standard abbreviations
- ISO 4: Annu. Rev. Financ. Econ.

Indexing
- ISSN: 1941-1367 (print); 1941-1375 (web)
- JSTOR: annurevifinaecon
- OCLC no.: 190859396

Links
- Journal homepage

The Annual Review of Financial Economics is a peer-reviewed academic journal that publishes an annual volume of review articles relevant to financial economics. It was established in 2009 and is published by Annual Reviews (AR). The co-editors are Hui Chen and Matthew P. Richardson. As of 2023, it is being published as open access, under the Subscribe to Open model.

== History ==
The Annual Review of Financial Economics was first published in 2009 by Annual Reviews (AR), a nonprofit organization whose stated mission is to synthesize knowledge "for the progress of science and the benefit of society." The journal's founding editors were Andrew Lo and Robert C. Merton. As of 2022, the editors are Hui Chen and Matthew P. Richardson.

== Scope and indexing ==
The Annual Review of Financial Economics defines its scope as covering significant developments in experimental, theoretical, and empirical aspects of financial economics. Included subfields are market microstructure, behavioral finance, experimental finance, financial institutions, capital markets, and corporate finance. As of 2026, Journal Citation Reports gives the journal a 2025 impact factor of 4.1, ranking it forty-fourth of 243 journal titles in the category "Business, Finance" and seventy-seventh of 626 in the category "Economics". It is abstracted and indexed in Scopus, Social Sciences Citation Index, INSPEC, EconLit, and PAIS International.

== Editorial processes ==
The Annual Review of Financial Economics is helmed by the editor or the co-editors. The editor is assisted by the editorial committee, which includes associate editors, regular members, and occasionally guest editors. Guest members participate at the invitation of the editor, and serve terms of one year. All other members of the editorial committee are appointed by the AR board of directors and serve five-year terms. The editorial committee determines which topics should be included in each volume and solicits reviews from qualified authors. Unsolicited manuscripts are not accepted. Peer review of accepted manuscripts is undertaken by the editorial committee.

=== Current editorial board ===
As of 2021, the editorial committee consists of the two co-editors and the following members:

- Tobias Adrian
- Yacine Aït-Sahalia
- Patrick Bolton
- Robert A. Jarrow
- Li Jin
- Kose John
- Deborah J. Lucas

== See also ==
- Annual Review of Economics
- List of economics journals
