= Edwin J. Elton =

American economist (born 1939)

Edwin Elton
- Born: October 5, 1939 (age 87)

Academic background
- Education: Ohio Wesleyan University; Carnegie Mellon University

Edwin J. Elton IV (born 5 October 1939) is a former Nomura Professor of Finance at New York University Stern School of Business and academic director of the Stern Doctoral Program.

== Biography ==
Elton has served as a portfolio theory and investment management consultant for major financial institutions in Asia, Europe, and the United States. He has been a senior research fellow at the International Institute of Management in Berlin and a visiting scholar at the European Institute for Advanced Studies in Management (EIASM) in Brussels and at Katholieke Universiteit Leuven.

He received the Graham Dodd Award for research in investments and was named Distinguished Scholar by the Eastern Finance Association. He is a former president of the American Finance Association.

Elton is currently associate editor of Journal of Banking and Finance and Journal of Accounting, Auditing, and Finance, and was formerly co-managing editor of The Journal of Finance. He has been a member of the board of directors of the American Finance Association and an associate editor of Management Science.

He received his BS in Math from Ohio Wesleyan, and his MS and PhD in Industrial Administration from Carnegie-Mellon.

== Publications ==
Elton has authored or coauthored eight books and over 110 articles. His book Modern Portfolio Theory and Investment Analysis is the standard textbook used in most leading graduate schools of business.

- Balduzzi, P.; E. Elton & T. Green (December 2001). Economic News and the Yield Curve: Evidence from the US Treasury Market. Vol. 36. Journal of Financial and Quantitative Analysis.
- Elton, E. (August 1999). Presidential Address: Expected Return, Realized Return and Asset Pricing Tests. Journal of Finance.
- Elton, E.; T. Green (October 1998). Tax and Liquidity in Pricing of Government Bonds. Vol. 53. Journal of Finance. pp. 1533–62.
- Elton, E.; M. Gruber (September 2004). Optimum Centralized Portfolio Construction with Decentralized Portfolio Management. Journal of Financial and Quantitative Analysis.
- Elton, E.; M. Gruber (March 2000). The Rationality of Asset Allocation Recommendations. Vol. 35. Journal of Financial and Quantitative Analysis.
- Elton, E.; M. Gruber; D. Agrawal; C. Mann (February 2001). Explaining the Rate Spread on Corporate Bonds?. Journal of Finance.
- Elton, E.; M. Gruber; D. Agrawal; C. Mann (November 2004). Factors Affecting the Valuation of Corporate Bonds. Journal of Banking and Finance.
- Elton, E.; M. Gruber & C. Blake (August 2006). The Adequacy of Investment Choices Offered By 401K Plans. Vol. 90. Journal of Public Economics. pp. 1299–1314.
- Elton, E.; M. Gruber & C. Blake (December 2001). A First Look at the Accuracy of the CRSP Mutual Fund Database and a Comparison of the CRSP and Morningstar Mutual Fund Databases. Vol. 56. Journal of Finance.
- Elton, E.; M. Gruber & C. Blake (1999). Common Factors in Active and Passive Portfolios. Vol. 3. European Financial Review.
- Elton, E.; M. Gruber & C. Blake (April 2003). Incentive Fees and Mutual Funds. Vol. 58. Journal of Finance.
- Elton, E.; M. Gruber & C. Blake (2005). Marginal Stockholder Tax Effects and Ex-Dividend Day Behavior-Thirty-Two Years Later. Vol. 87. Review of Economics and Statistics. pp. 579–586.
- Elton, E.; M. Gruber & C. Blake. Monthly Holdings Data and the Selection of Superior Mutual Funds.
- Elton, E.; M. Gruber & C. Blake (April 2007). Participant Reaction and the Performance of Funds Offered by 401(k) Plans. Vol. 16. Journal of Financial Intermediation. pp. 240–271.
- Elton, E.; M. Gruber & J. Busse (February 2004). Are Investors Rational? Choices among Index Funds. Vol. 59. Journal of Finance.
- Elton, E.; M. Gruber; G. Comer; K. Li (December 2001). Spiders: Where Are the Bugs?. Vol. 75. Journal of Business.
- Elton, E.; M. Gruber & T. Green (June 2007). The Impact of Mutual Fund Family Membership on Investor Risk. Vol. 42. Journal of Financial and Quantitative Analysis. pp. 257–278.
- Elton, E.; M. Gruber; J. Krasny; S. Ozelge. The Effect of the Frequency of Holding Data on Conclusions about Mutual Fund Behavior.
- Elton, E.; M. Gruber & J. Spitzer (June 2006). Improved Estimates of Correlation Coefficients and Their Impact on the Optimum Portfolios. Vol. 12. European Financial Management. pp. 303–318.
- Elton, Edwin; J Gruber; Martin J (2010). Investments and Portfolio Performance. World Scientific. p. 416. ISBN 978-981-4335-39-3.
