= The Review of Financial Studies =

- Discipline: Finance
- Language: English
- Edited by: Tarun Ramadorai

Publication details
- History: 1988-present
- Publisher: Oxford University Press on behalf of the Society for Financial Studies
- Frequency: Monthly
- Open access: No
- Impact factor: 8.2 (2022)

Standard abbreviations
- ISO 4: Rev. Financ. Stud.

Indexing
- ISSN: 0893-9454 (print); 1465-7368 (web)
- LCCN: sf93094251
- OCLC no.: 40777420

Links
- Journal homepage; Online access; Online archive

The Review of Financial Studies is a peer-reviewed academic journal covering the field of finance. It is published by Oxford University Press on behalf of the Society for Financial Studies. It was established following discussions at the 1986 Western Finance Association meetings, and the first issue was published in 1988. The current editor-in-chief is Tarun Ramadorai. It is considered to be one of the premier finance journals. According to the Journal Citation Reports, the journal has a 2020 impact factor of 5.814, ranking it 5/110 in the category "BUSINESS, FINANCE".

== Editors ==
The following persons are or have been editors-in-chief:

- Tarun Ramadorai (Imperial College London, 2024--present)
- Itay Goldstein (University of Pennsylvania, 2018–2024)
- Andrew Karolyi (Cornell University, 2014–2018)
- David Hirshleifer (UC Irvine, 2011–2014)
- Matthew Spiegel (Yale University, 2005–2011)
- Maureen O'Hara (Cornell University, 2000–2005)
- Ravi Jagannathan (Northwestern University, 1997–2000)
- Franklin Allen (University of Pennsylvania, 1994–1997)
- Chester Spatt (Carnegie Mellon University, 1991–1994)
- Michael Brennan (UCLA; 1988–1990)

== Awards ==
The Michael J. Brennan Best Paper Award, named after the first editor of the journal, is an annual prize given to authors of the best paper published in the journal in the past year. The first prize is US$10,000 and the second prize is US$5,000. The journal also awards a Rising Scholar Award, a Referee of the Year Award, and multiple Distinguished Referee Awards. The winners are announced at the Society for Financial Studies Cavalcade conference in May as well as on its website. The winners are selected by the editorial board, including the executive editor, the co-editors, and the associate editors.
