= Journal of Financial Economics =

One of the premier finance journals

- Discipline: Financial economics
- Language: English
- Edited by: Toni Whited

Publication details
- History: 1974–present
- Publisher: Elsevier
- Frequency: Monthly
- Impact factor: 6.988 (2020)

Standard abbreviations
- ISO 4: J. Financ. Econ.

Indexing
- CODEN: JFECDT
- ISSN: 0304-405X
- LCCN: 84649771
- OCLC no.: 863010774

Links
- Journal homepage; Online archive; Journal page

The Journal of Financial Economics is a peer-reviewed academic journal published by Elsevier, covering the field of finance. It is considered to be one of the premier finance journals. According to the Journal Citation Reports, the journal has a 2020 impact factor of 6.988. The journal was founded by Michael C. Jensen, Eugene Fama, and Robert C. Merton in 1974.

== Editors–in–chief ==
The following persons are or have been an editor-in-chief of the journal:

- Eugene Fama, 1974–1977
- Michael C. Jensen, 1974–1996
- Robert C. Merton, 1974–1977
- G. William Schwert, 1979–1986, 1989–2021
- John B. Long, 1983–1987, 1988–1996
- Clifford W. Smith, 1983–1996
- René M. Stulz, 1983–1987
- Jerold B. Warner, 1987–1996
- Richard S. Ruback, 1988–1996
- Wayne Mikkelson, 1993–1996
- Ron Kaniel, 2017–2021
- David Hirshleifer, 2020–2021
- Toni Whited, 2021–present

== Awards ==
The journal issues two annual prizes for economics research, Jensen Prize and Fama–DFA Prize.
