= The Journal of Finance =

- Discipline: Finance, economics, business
- Language: English
- Edited by: Antoinette Schoar

Publication details
- History: 1946-present
- Publisher: Wiley-Blackwell for the American Finance Association
- Frequency: Bimonthly
- Impact factor: 7.870 (2021)

Standard abbreviations
- ISO 4: J. Finance

Indexing
- CODEN: JLFIAN
- ISSN: 0022-1082 (print); 1540-6261 (web)
- LCCN: 49022513
- JSTOR: 00221082
- OCLC no.: 1782429

Links
- Journal homepage; Online access; Online archive

The Journal of Finance is a peer-reviewed academic journal published by Wiley-Blackwell on behalf of the American Finance Association. It was established in 1946. The editor-in-chief is Antoinette Schoar. According to the Journal Citation Reports, the journal has a 2021 impact factor of 7.870, ranking it 6th out of 111 journals in the category "Business, Finance" and 16th out of 381 journals in the category "Economics".

== Editors ==
The editorial board consists of the editor, co-editors, and associate editors. The current editor is Antoinette Schoar (MIT).

The following persons are or have been editor-in-chief of the journal:

- Marshall Ketchum (University of Chicago, 1946-1955)
- Harold Fraine (University of Wisconsin–Madison, 1956-1958)
- Joel Segall (University of Chicago, 1958-1960)
- Harold Fraine (University of Wisconsin–Madison, 1961-1963)
- Lawrence Ritter (New York University, 1964-1966)
- Dudley Luckett (Iowa State University, 1967-1970)
- Alexander A. Robichek (Stanford University, 1971-1973)
- Jack M. Guttentag (University of Pennsylvania, 1974-1977)
- Marshall E. Blume (University of Pennsylvania, 1977-1980)
- Michael J. Brennan (University of British Columbia, 1980-1983)
- Edwin J. Elton and Martin J. Gruber (New York University, 1983-1988)
- René M. Stulz (Ohio State University, 1988-1999)
- Richard C. Green (Carnegie Mellon University, 2000-2003)
- Robert F. Stambaugh (University of Pennsylvania, 2004-2005)
- Geert Bekaert (Columbia, 2005-2006)
- Campbell Harvey (Duke University, 2006-2012)
- Kenneth J. Singleton (Stanford University, 2012-2016)
- Stefan Nagel (University of Chicago, 2016-2022)
- Antoinette Schoar (MIT, 2022-present)

== Awards ==
Each year the associate editors vote for the best papers published in the journal. The Smith Breeden Prize is awarded for the best finance papers and the Brattle Prize for the best corporate finance research papers.
