= Savitzky–Golay filter =

Algorithm to smooth data points

The Savitzky-Golay smoothing being applied, passing through the data from left to right in a moving window fashion. The red line represents the local polynomial being used to fit a subset of the data. From this, the smoothed values - shown as a purple line - are derived by evaluating the polynomial at the central point of the moving window.

A Savitzky–Golay filter is a digital filter that can be applied to a set of digital data points for the purpose of smoothing the data, that is, to increase the precision of the data without distorting the signal tendency. This is achieved, in a process known as convolution, by fitting successive sub-sets of adjacent data points with a low-degree polynomial by the method of linear least squares. When the data points are equally spaced, an analytical solution to the least-squares equations can be found, in the form of a single set of "convolution coefficients" that can be applied to all data sub-sets, to give estimates of the smoothed signal, (or derivatives of the smoothed signal) at the central point of each sub-set. The method, based on established mathematical procedures, was popularized by Abraham Savitzky and Marcel J. E. Golay, who published tables of convolution coefficients for various polynomials and sub-set sizes in 1964. Some errors in the tables have been corrected. The method has been extended for the treatment of 2- and 3-dimensional data.

Savitzky and Golay's paper is one of the most widely cited papers in the journal Analytical Chemistry and is classed by that journal as one of its "10 seminal papers" saying "it can be argued that the dawn of the computer-controlled analytical instrument can be traced to this article".

Application of the smoothing to a noisy signal with Gaussian peaks via a discrete convolution with a subsequent polynomial fit at the boundaries. Compared to the sequential direct polynomial fitting shown above, this can be achieved more efficiently. The sudden drops to 0 at the edges of the filter cause discontinuities which limit the noise suppression capabilities of the Savitzky-Golay filter in practice.

== Applications ==
The data consists of a set of points $\left\{(x_j, y_j)\right\}_{j = 1}^n$, where $x_j$ is an independent variable and $y_j$ is an observed value. They are treated with a set of $m$ convolution coefficients, $C_i$, according to the expression
$$Y_j= \sum _{i=-s}^s C_i\, y_{j+i},\qquad s+1 \le j \le n-s, \;\; s = \frac{m-1}{2}$$
Selected convolution coefficients are shown in the tables, below. For example, for smoothing by a 5-point quadratic polynomial, $m = 5, i = -2, -1, 0, 1, 2$ and the $j$-th smoothed data point, $Y_j$, is given by

$$Y_j = \frac{1}{35} \left(-3  y_{j - 2} + 12  y_{j - 1} + 17  y_j + 12  y_{j + 1} -3  y_{j + 2}\right),$$

where, $C_{-2} = -3/35, C_{-1} = 12/35$, etc. There are numerous applications of smoothing, such as avoiding the propagation of noise through an algorithm chain, or sometimes simply to make the data appear to be less noisy than it really is.

The following are applications of numerical differentiation of data. Note When calculating the nth derivative, an additional scaling factor of $\frac{n!}{h^n}$ may be applied to all calculated data points to obtain absolute values (see expressions for $\frac{d^nY}{dx^n}$, below, for details).

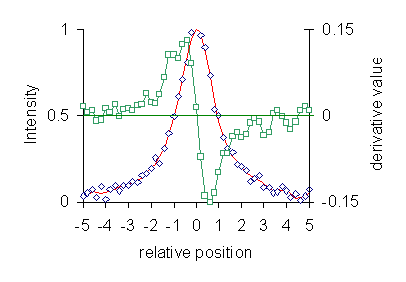
(1) Synthetic Lorentzian + noise (blue) and 1st derivative (green)

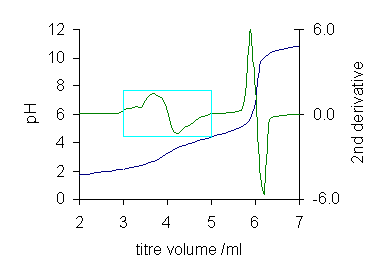
(2) Titration curve (blue) for malonic acid and 2nd derivative (green). The part in the light blue box is magnified 10 times

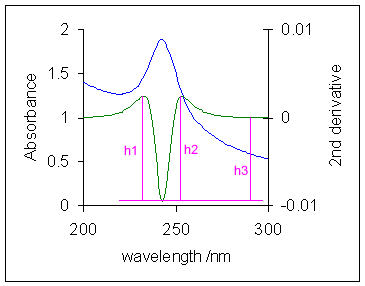
(3) Lorentzian on exponential baseline (blue) and 2nd derivative (green)

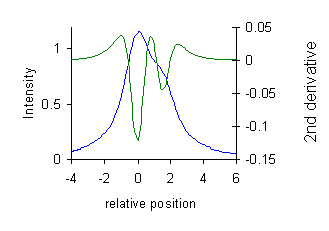
(4) Sum of two Lorentzians (blue) and 2nd derivative (green)

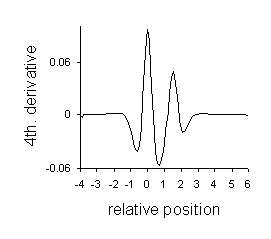
(5) 4th derivative of the sum of two Lorentzians

1. Location of maxima and minima in experimental data curves. This was the application that first motivated Savitzky. The first derivative of a function is zero at a maximum or minimum. The diagram shows data points belonging to a synthetic Lorentzian curve, with added noise (blue diamonds). Data are plotted on a scale of half width, relative to the peak maximum at zero. The smoothed curve (red line) and 1st derivative (green) were calculated with 7-point cubic Savitzky–Golay filters. Linear interpolation of the first derivative values at positions either side of the zero-crossing gives the position of the peak maximum. 3rd derivatives can also be used for this purpose.
2. Location of an end-point in a titration curve. An end-point is an inflection point where the second derivative of the function is zero. The titration curve for malonic acid illustrates the power of the method. The first end-point at 4 ml is barely visible, but the second derivative allows its value to be easily determined by linear interpolation to find the zero crossing.
3. Baseline flattening. In analytical chemistry it is sometimes necessary to measure the height of an absorption band against a curved baseline. Because the curvature of the baseline is much less than the curvature of the absorption band, the second derivative effectively flattens the baseline. Three measures of the derivative height, which is proportional to the absorption band height, are the "peak-to-valley" distances h1 and h2, and the height from baseline, h3.
4. Resolution enhancement in spectroscopy. Bands in the second derivative of a spectroscopic curve are narrower than the bands in the spectrum: they have reduced half-width. This allows partially overlapping bands to be "resolved" into separate (negative) peaks. The diagram illustrates how this may be used also for chemical analysis, using measurement of "peak-to-valley" distances. In this case the valleys are a property of the 2nd derivative of a Lorentzian. (x-axis position is relative to the position of the peak maximum on a scale of half width at half height).
5. Resolution enhancement with 4th derivative (positive peaks). The minima are a property of the 4th derivative of a Lorentzian.

=== Moving average ===
The "moving average filter" is a trivial example of a Savitzky–Golay filter that is commonly used with time series data to smooth out short-term fluctuations and highlight longer-term trends or cycles. Each subset of the data set is fit with a straight horizontal line as opposed to a higher order polynomial. An unweighted moving average filter is the simplest convolution filter.

The moving average is often used for a quick technical analysis of financial data, like stock prices, returns or trading volumes. It is also used in economics to examine gross domestic product, employment or other macroeconomic time series.

It was not included in some tables of Savitzky-Golay convolution coefficients as all the coefficient values are identical, with the value $\frac{1}{m}$.

== Derivation of convolution coefficients ==
When the data points are equally spaced, an analytical solution to the least-squares equations can be found. This solution forms the basis of the convolution method of numerical smoothing and differentiation. Suppose that the data consists of a set of n points (x_{j}, y_{j}) (j = 1, ..., n), where x_{j} is an independent variable and y_{j} is a datum value. A polynomial will be fitted by linear least squares to a set of m (an odd number) adjacent data points, each separated by an interval h. Firstly, a change of variable is made
$$z = \frac{x - \bar x}{h}$$
where ${\bar x}$ is the value of the central point. z takes the values $-s,\dots,0,\dots,s$ where $s = \tfrac{m-1}{2}$ (e.g. m = 5 → z = −2, −1, 0, 1, 2). (Note: With even values of m, z will run from 1 − m to m − 1 in steps of 2) The polynomial, of degree k is defined as (Note: The simple moving average is a special case with k = 0, Y = a_{0}. In this case all convolution coefficients are equal to 1/m.)
$$Y = a_0 + a_1 z + a_2 z^2 + \dots + a_k z^k.$$
The coefficients a_{0}, a_{1} etc. are obtained by solving the normal equations (bold a represents a vector, bold J represents a matrix).

$$\mathbf{a} = \left( \mathbf{J}^\mathsf{T} \mathbf{J} \right)^{-1} \mathbf{J}^\mathsf{T} \mathbf{y},$$
where $\mathbf J$ is a Vandermonde matrix, that is $i$-th row of $\mathbf J$ has values $1, z_i, z_i^2, \dots$.

For example, for a cubic polynomial fitted to 5 points, z = −2, −1, 0, 1, 2 the normal equations are solved as follows.

$$\mathbf{J} =
\begin{pmatrix}
1 & -2 & 4 & -8 \\
1 & - 1 & 1 & -1 \\
1 & 0 & 0 & 0 \\
1 & 1 & 1 & 1 \\
1 & 2 & 4 & 8
\end{pmatrix}$$

$$\begin{align}
\mathbf{J}^\mathsf{T}\mathbf{J}
&= \begin{pmatrix}
m & \sum z & \sum z^2 & \sum z^3 \\
\sum z & \sum z^2 & \sum z^3 & \sum z^4 \\
\sum z^2 & \sum z^3 & \sum z^4 & \sum z^5 \\
\sum z^3 & \sum z^4 & \sum z^5 & \sum z^6
\end{pmatrix} \\[1ex]
&= \begin{pmatrix}
m & 0 & \sum z^2 & 0 \\
0 & \sum z^2 & 0 & \sum z^4 \\
\sum z^2 & 0 & \sum z^4 & 0 \\
0 & \sum z^4 & 0 & \sum z^6
\end{pmatrix} \\[1ex]
&= \begin{pmatrix}
5 & 0 & 10 & 0  \\
0 & 10 & 0 & 34 \\
10 & 0 & 34 & 0 \\
0 & 34 & 0 & 130
\end{pmatrix}
\end{align}$$

Now, the normal equations can be factored into two separate sets of equations, by rearranging rows and columns, with

$$\mathbf{J}^\mathsf{T}\mathbf{J}_\text{even} = \begin{pmatrix}
5 & 10 \\
10 & 34 \\
\end{pmatrix}
\quad \mathrm{and} \quad
\mathbf{J}^\mathsf{T}\mathbf{J}_\text{odd} = \begin{pmatrix}
10 & 34 \\
34 & 130 \\
\end{pmatrix}$$
Expressions for the inverse of each of these matrices can be obtained using Cramer's rule
$$\left(\mathbf{J}^\mathsf{T}\mathbf{J}\right)^{-1}_\text{even} = \frac{1}{70}
\begin{pmatrix}
34 & -10\\
-10 & 5 \\
\end{pmatrix}
\quad \mathrm{and} \quad
\left(\mathbf{J}^\mathsf{T}\mathbf{J}\right)^{-1}_\text{odd} = \frac{1}{144}
\begin{pmatrix}
130 & -34\\
-34 & 10 \\
\end{pmatrix}$$
The normal equations become
$$\begin{pmatrix} a_0 \\ a_2 \end{pmatrix}_j =
\frac{1}{70}
\begin{pmatrix}
34 & -10 \\
-10  & 5
\end{pmatrix}
\begin{pmatrix}
1 & 1 & 1 & 1 & 1 \\
4 & 1 & 0 & 1 & 4
\end{pmatrix}
\begin{pmatrix}y_{j-2}  \\ y_{j-1}  \\ y_j  \\ y_{j+1}  \\ y_{j+2} \end{pmatrix}$$
and
$$\begin{pmatrix} a_1  \\ a_3 \end{pmatrix}_j=
\frac{1}{144}
\begin{pmatrix}
130 & -34 \\
-34  & 10
\end{pmatrix}
\begin{pmatrix}
-2 & -1 & 0 & 1 & 2 \\
-8 & -1 & 0 & 1 & 8
\end{pmatrix}
\begin{pmatrix}y_{j-2}  \\ y_{j-1}  \\ y_j  \\ y_{j+1}  \\ y_{j+2}  \\\end{pmatrix}$$
Multiplying out and removing common factors,
$$\begin{align}
a_{0,j} &= \frac{1}{35} \left(-3y_{j-2} + 12y_{j-1} + 17y_j + 12y_{j+1} - 3y_{j+2}\right) \\[1ex]
a_{1,j} &= \frac{1}{12} \left(y_{j-2} - 8y_{j-1} + 8y_{j+1} - y_{j+2}\right) \\[1ex]
a_{2,j} &= \frac{1}{14} \left(2y_{j-2} - y_{j-1} - 2y_j -y_{j+1} + 2y_{j+2}\right) \\[1ex]
a_{3,j} &= \frac{1}{12} \left(-y_{j-2} + 2y_{j-1} - 2y_{j+1} + y_{j+2}\right)
\end{align}$$

The coefficients of y in these expressions are known as convolution coefficients. They are elements of the matrix
$$\mathbf{C} = \left(\mathbf{J}^\mathsf{T} \mathbf{J}\right)^{-1} \mathbf{J}^\mathsf{T}$$
In general,
$$(C \otimes y)_j\ = Y_j = \sum_{i=-s}^s C_i\, y_{j+i},\qquad
s+1 \le j \le n-s, \;\; s = \frac{m-1}{2}$$
In matrix notation this example is written as
$$\begin{pmatrix} Y_3 \\ Y_4 \\ Y_5 \\ \vdots \end{pmatrix}
= \frac{1}{35}
\begin{pmatrix}
- 3 & 12 & 17 & 12 & -3 &  0 & 0  & \cdots \\
0 & -3 & 12 & 17 & 12 & -3 & 0  & \cdots \\
0 & 0 & - 3 & 12 & 17 & 12 & -3 & \cdots \\
\vdots & \vdots & \vdots & \vdots & \vdots & \vdots & \vdots & \ddots
\end{pmatrix}
\begin{pmatrix} y_1 \\ y_2 \\ y_3 \\ y_4 \\ y_5 \\ y_6 \\ y_7 \\ \vdots \end{pmatrix}$$

Tables of convolution coefficients, calculated in the same way for m up to 25, were published for the Savitzky–Golay smoothing filter in 1964, The value of the central point, z = 0, is obtained from a single set of coefficients, a_{0} for smoothing, a_{1} for 1st derivative etc. The numerical derivatives are obtained by differentiating Y. This means that the derivatives are calculated for the smoothed data curve. For a cubic polynomial
$$\begin{align}
Y &= a_0  + a_1 z + a_2 z^2 + a_3 z^3= a_0 &\text{ at } z = 0, x = \bar x \\[1ex]
\frac{dY}{dx} &= \frac{1}{h} \left( {a_1  + 2a_2 z + 3a_3 z^2 } \right) = \frac{1}{h}a_1 & \text{ at } z = 0, x = \bar x \\[1ex]
\frac{d^2 Y}{dx^2} &= \frac{1}{h^2} \left( {2a_2  + 6a_3 z} \right) = \frac{2}{h^2}a_2 & \text{ at } z =0, x = \bar x \\[1ex]
\frac{d^3 Y}{dx^3} &= \frac{6}{h^3} a_3
\end{align}$$

In general, polynomials of degree (0 and 1), (Note: Smoothing using the moving average is equivalent, with equally spaced points, to local fitting with a (sloping) straight line) (2 and 3), (4 and 5) etc. give the same coefficients for smoothing and even derivatives. Polynomials of degree (1 and 2), (3 and 4) etc. give the same coefficients for odd derivatives.

=== Algebraic expressions ===
It is not necessary always to use the Savitzky–Golay tables. The summations in the matrix J^{T}J can be evaluated in closed form,
$$\begin{align}
\sum_{z=-s}^s z^2 &= {m(m^2-1) \over 12}, & s = \frac{m-1}{2} \\
\sum_z z^4 &= {m(m^2-1)(3m^2-7) \over 240} \\
\sum_z z^6 &= {m(m^2-1)(3m^4-18m^2+31) \over 1344}
\end{align}$$
so that algebraic formulae can be derived for the convolution coefficients. (Note: The expressions given here are different from those of Madden, which are given in terms of the variable m' = (m − 1)/2.) Functions that are suitable for use with a curve that has an inflection point are:

- Smoothing, polynomial degree 2,3 : $C_{0i} = \frac{{\left( {3m^2 - 7 - 20i^2 } \right)/4}}{{m\left( {m^2 - 4} \right)/3}}; \quad \frac{1-m}{2} \le i \le \frac{m-1}{2}$ (the range of values for i also applies to the expressions below)
- 1st derivative: polynomial degree 3,4 $C_{1i} = \frac{ {5\left( {3m^4 - 18m^2 + 31} \right)i - 28\left( {3m^2 - 7} \right)i^3 }} {{m\left( {m^2 - 1} \right)\left( {3m^4 - 39m^2 + 108} \right)/15}}$
- 2nd derivative: polynomial degree 2,3 $C_{2i} = \frac{{12mi^2 - m\left( {m^2 - 1} \right)}} {{m^2\left({m^2 - 1} \right) \left( {m^2 - 4} \right)/30}}$
- 3rd derivative: polynomial degree 3,4 $C_{3i} = \frac{{ - \left( {3m^2 - 7} \right)i + 20i^3 }} {{m\left( {m^2 - 1} \right)\left( {3m^4 - 39m^2 + 108} \right)/420}}$

Simpler expressions that can be used with curves that don't have an inflection point are:

- Smoothing, polynomial degree 0,1 (moving average): $C_{0i} = \frac{1}{m}$
- 1st derivative, polynomial degree 1,2: $C_{1i} = \frac{i}{m(m^2-1)/12}$

Higher derivatives can be obtained. For example, a fourth derivative can be obtained by performing two passes of a second derivative function.

=== Use of orthogonal polynomials ===
An alternative to fitting m data points by a simple polynomial in the subsidiary variable, z, is to use orthogonal polynomials.
$$Y = b_0 P^0(z)  + b_1 P^1(z)   \cdots  + b_k P^k(z).$$
where P^{0}, ..., P^{k} is a set of mutually orthogonal polynomials of degree 0, ..., k. Full details on how to obtain expressions for the orthogonal polynomials and the relationship between the coefficients b and a are given by Guest. Expressions for the convolution coefficients are easily obtained because the normal equations matrix, J^{T}J, is a diagonal matrix as the product of any two orthogonal polynomials is zero by virtue of their mutual orthogonality. Therefore, each non-zero element of its inverse is simply the reciprocal of the corresponding element in the normal equation matrix. The calculation is further simplified by using recursion to build orthogonal Gram polynomials. The whole calculation can be coded in a few lines of PASCAL, a computer language well-adapted for calculations involving recursion.

=== Treatment of first and last points ===
Savitzky–Golay filters are most commonly used to obtain the smoothed or derivative value at the central point, z = 0, using a single set of convolution coefficients. (m − 1)/2 points at the start and end of the series cannot be calculated using this process. Various strategies can be employed to avoid this inconvenience.

- The data could be artificially extended by adding, in reverse order, copies of the first (m − 1)/2 points at the beginning and copies of the last (m − 1)/2 points at the end. For instance, with m = 5, two points are added at the start and end of the data y_{1}, ..., y_{n}.

y_{3},y_{2},y_{1}, ... ,y_{n}, y_{n−1}, y_{n−2}.

- Looking again at the fitting polynomial, it is obvious that data can be calculated for all values of z by using all sets of convolution coefficients for a single polynomial, a_{0} .. a_{k}.
  For a cubic polynomial
  $$\begin{align}
Y&=a_0+a_1 z  + a_2 z^2 + a_3 z^3\\
\frac{dY}{dx} &= \frac{1}{h}(a_1 + 2a_2 z + 3a_3 z^2) \\
\frac{d^2 Y}{dx^2} &= \frac 1 {h^2 }(2a_2 + 6a_3 z) \\
\frac{d^3 Y}{dx^3} &= \frac{6}{h^3 }a_3
\end{align}$$
- Convolution coefficients for the missing first and last points can also be easily obtained. This is also equivalent to fitting the first (m + 1)/2 points with the same polynomial, and similarly for the last points.

=== Weighting the data ===
It is implicit in the above treatment that the data points are all given equal weight. Technically, the objective function
$$U = \sum_i w_i \left(Y_i - y_i\right)^2$$
being minimized in the least-squares process has unit weights, w_{i} = 1. When weights are not all the same the normal equations become

$$\mathbf a = \left( \mathbf{J}^\mathsf{T} \mathbf{W} \mathbf{J} \right)^{-1} \mathbf{J}^\mathsf{T} \mathbf{W} \mathbf{y}, \qquad W_{i,i} \ne 1$$

A weighted Savitzky-Golay filter applied to the noisy signal from the introduction of this article. With a Hann window, the quality of the smoothed curve can be improved compared to an unweighted (uniformly weighted) Savitzky-Golay filter with the same window length and polynomial degree. On the one hand, less residual noise is observed while a higher data fidelity is obtained on the other hand (except for the boundaries where the weights favour higher deviations).

If the same set of diagonal weights is used for all data subsets, $W = \text{diag}(w_1,w_2,...,w_m)$, an analytical solution to the normal equations can be written down. For example, with a quadratic polynomial,

$$\mathbf{J}^\mathsf{T}\mathbf{W}\mathbf{J} =
\begin{pmatrix} \sum w_i~~~ & \sum w_i z_i & \sum w_i z_i^2 \\
\sum w_i z_i & \sum w_i z_i^2 & \sum w_i z_i^3 \\
\sum w_i z_i^2 & \sum w_i z_i^3 & \sum w_i z_i^4
\end{pmatrix}$$

An explicit expression for the inverse of this matrix can be obtained using Cramer's rule. A set of convolution coefficients may then be derived as

$$\mathbf{C} = \left( \mathbf{J}^\mathsf{T} \mathbf{W} \mathbf{J} \right)^{-1} \mathbf{J}^\mathsf{T} \mathbf{W}.$$

Alternatively the coefficients, C, could be calculated in a spreadsheet, employing a built-in matrix inversion routine to obtain the inverse of the normal equations matrix. This set of coefficients, once calculated and stored, can be used with all calculations in which the same weighting scheme applies. A different set of coefficients is needed for each different weighting scheme.

It was shown that Savitzky–Golay filter can be improved by introducing weights that decrease at the ends of the fitting interval.

== Two-dimensional convolution coefficients ==
Two-dimensional smoothing and differentiation can also be applied to tables of data values, such as intensity values in a photographic image which is composed of a rectangular grid of pixels. Such a grid is referred as a kernel, and the data points that constitute the kernel are referred as nodes. The trick is to transform the rectangular kernel into a single row by a simple ordering of the indices of the nodes. Whereas the one-dimensional filter coefficients are found by fitting a polynomial in the subsidiary variable z to a set of m data points, the two-dimensional coefficients are found by fitting a polynomial in subsidiary variables v and w to a set of the values at the m × n kernel nodes. The following example, for a bivariate polynomial of total degree 3, m = 7, and n = 5, illustrates the process, which parallels the process for the one dimensional case, above.
$$\begin{align}
v &= \frac{x - \bar x}{h(x)}; &
w &= \frac{y - \bar y}{h(y)}
\end{align}$$
$$Y = a_{00}  + a_{10}v + a_{01}w + a_{20}v^2 + a_{11}vw + a_{02}w^2 + a_{30}v^3 + a_{21}v^2w + a_{12}vw^2 + a_{03}w^3$$
The rectangular kernel of 35 data values, d_{1} − d_{35}

v w	−3	−2	−1	0	1	2	3
−2	d_{1}	d_{2}	d_{3}	d_{4}	d_{5}	d_{6}	d_{7}
−1	d_{8}	d_{9}	d_{10}	d_{11}	d_{12}	d_{13}	d_{14}
0	d_{15}	d_{16}	d_{17}	d_{18}	d_{19}	d_{20}	d_{21}
1	d_{22}	d_{23}	d_{24}	d_{25}	d_{26}	d_{27}	d_{28}
2	d_{29}	d_{30}	d_{31}	d_{32}	d_{33}	d_{34}	d_{35}

becomes a vector when the rows are placed one after another.

d = (d_{1} ... d_{35})^{T}

The Jacobian has 10 columns, one for each of the parameters a_{00} − a_{03}, and 35 rows, one for each pair of v and w values. Each row has the form
$$J_\text{row} = \begin{pmatrix} 1 & v & w & v^2 & vw & w^2 & v^3 & v^2w & vw^2 & w^3 \end{pmatrix}$$
The convolution coefficients are calculated as
$$\mathbf{C} = \left( \mathbf{J}^\mathsf{T} \mathbf{J}  \right)^{-1} \mathbf{J}^\mathsf{T}$$
The first row of C contains 35 convolution coefficients, which can be multiplied with the 35 data values, respectively, to obtain the polynomial coefficient $a_{00}$, which is the smoothed value at the central node of the kernel (i.e. at the 18th node of the above table). Similarly, other rows of C can be multiplied with the 35 values to obtain other polynomial coefficients, which, in turn, can be used to obtain smoothed values and different smoothed partial derivatives at different nodes.

Nikitas and Pappa-Louisi showed that depending on the format of the used polynomial, the quality of smoothing may vary significantly. They recommend using the polynomial of the form

$$Y = \sum_{i = 0}^p \sum_{j = 0}^q a_{i j} v^i w^j$$

because such polynomials can achieve good smoothing both in the central and in the near-boundary regions of a kernel, and therefore they can be confidently used in smoothing both at the internal and at the near-boundary data points of a sampled domain. In order to avoid ill-conditioning when solving the least-squares problem, p < m and q < n. For software that calculates the two-dimensional coefficients and for a database of such C's, see the section on multi-dimensional convolution coefficients, below.

== Multi-dimensional convolution coefficients ==
The idea of two-dimensional convolution coefficients can be extended to the higher spatial dimensions as well, in a straightforward manner, by arranging multidimensional distribution of the kernel nodes in a single row. Following the aforementioned finding by Nikitas and Pappa-Louisi in two-dimensional cases, usage of the following form of the polynomial is recommended in multidimensional cases:

$$Y = \sum_{i_1 = 0}^{p_1} \sum_{i_2 = 0}^{p_2} \cdots \sum_{i_D = 0}^{p_D} (a_{i_1 i_2 \cdots i_D} \times u_1^{i_1} u_2^{i_2} \cdots u_D^{i_D})$$

where D is the dimension of the space, $a$'s are the polynomial coefficients, and u's are the coordinates in the different spatial directions. Algebraic expressions for partial derivatives of any order, be it mixed or otherwise, can be easily derived from the above expression. Note that C depends on the manner in which the kernel nodes are arranged in a row and on the manner in which the different terms of the expanded form of the above polynomial is arranged, when preparing the Jacobian.

Accurate computation of C in multidimensional cases becomes challenging, as precision of standard floating point numbers available in computer programming languages no longer remain sufficient. The insufficient precision causes the floating point truncation errors to become comparable to the magnitudes of some C elements, which, in turn, severely degrades its accuracy and renders it useless. Chandra Shekhar has brought forth two open source software, Advanced Convolution Coefficient Calculator (ACCC) and Precise Convolution Coefficient Calculator (PCCC), which handle these accuracy issues adequately. ACCC performs the computation by using floating point numbers, in an iterative manner. The precision of the floating-point numbers is gradually increased in each iteration, by using GNU MPFR. Once the obtained C's in two consecutive iterations start having same significant digits until a pre-specified distance, the convergence is assumed to have reached. If the distance is sufficiently large, the computation yields a highly accurate C. PCCC employs rational number calculations, by using GNU Multiple Precision Arithmetic Library, and yields a fully accurate C, in the rational number format. In the end, these rational numbers are converted into floating point numbers, until a pre-specified number of significant digits.

A database of C's that are calculated by using ACCC, for symmetric kernels and both symmetric and asymmetric polynomials, on unity-spaced kernel nodes, in the 1, 2, 3, and 4 dimensional spaces, is made available. Chandra Shekhar has also laid out a mathematical framework that describes usage of C calculated on unity-spaced kernel nodes to perform filtering and partial differentiations (of various orders) on non-uniformly spaced kernel nodes, allowing usage of C provided in the aforementioned database. Although this method yields approximate results only, they are acceptable in most engineering applications, provided that non-uniformity of the kernel nodes is weak.

== Some properties of convolution ==
1. The sum of convolution coefficients for smoothing is equal to one. The sum of coefficients for odd derivatives is zero.
2. The sum of squared convolution coefficients for smoothing is equal to the value of the central coefficient.
3. Smoothing of a function leaves the area under the function unchanged.
4. Convolution of a symmetric function with even-derivative coefficients conserves the centre of symmetry.
5. Properties of derivative filters.

=== Signal distortion and noise reduction ===
It is inevitable that the signal will be distorted in the convolution process. From property 3 above, when data which has a peak is smoothed the peak height will be reduced and the half-width will be increased. Both the extent of the distortion and S/N (signal-to-noise ratio) improvement:

- decrease as the degree of the polynomial increases
- increase as the width, m of the convolution function increases

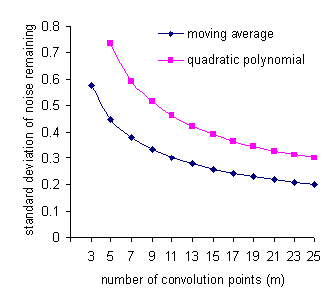
Effect of smoothing on data points with uncorrelated noise of unit standard deviation

For example, If the noise in all data points is uncorrelated and has a constant standard deviation, σ, the standard deviation on the noise will be decreased by convolution with an m-point smoothing function to (Note: The expressions under the square root sign are the same as the expression for the convolution coefficient with z = 0)

- polynomial degree 0 or 1:$\sqrt{\frac{1}{m}} \sigma$ (moving average)
- polynomial degree 2 or 3: $\sqrt{\frac{3(3m^2-7)}{4m(m^2-4)}} \sigma$.

These functions are shown in the plot at the right. For example, with a 9-point linear function (moving average) two thirds of the noise is removed and with a 9-point quadratic/cubic smoothing function only about half the noise is removed. Most of the noise remaining is low-frequency noise(see Frequency characteristics of convolution filters, below).

Although the moving average function gives better noise reduction it is unsuitable for smoothing data which has curvature over m points. A quadratic filter function is unsuitable for getting a derivative of a data curve with an inflection point because a quadratic polynomial does not have one. The optimal choice of polynomial order and number of convolution coefficients will be a compromise between noise reduction and distortion.

==== Multipass filters ====
One way to mitigate distortion and improve noise removal is to use a filter of smaller width and perform more than one convolution with it. For two passes of the same filter this is equivalent to one pass of a filter obtained by convolution of the original filter with itself. For example, 2 passes of the filter with coefficients (1/3, 1/3, 1/3) is equivalent to 1 pass of the filter with coefficients (1/9, 2/9, 3/9, 2/9, 1/9).

The disadvantage of multipassing is that the equivalent filter width for $n$ passes of an $m$–point function is $n (m-1) + 1$ so multipassing is subject to greater end-effects. Nevertheless, multipassing has been used to great advantage. For instance, some 40–80 passes on data with a signal-to-noise ratio of only 5 gave useful results. The noise reduction formulae given above do not apply because correlation between calculated data points increases with each pass.

=== Frequency characteristics of convolution filters ===
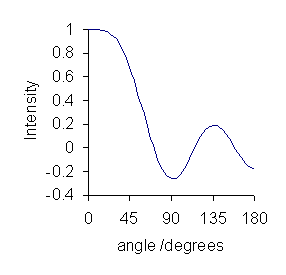
Fourier transform of the 9-point quadratic/cubic smoothing function

Convolution maps to multiplication in the Fourier co-domain. The discrete Fourier transform of a convolution filter is a real-valued function which can be represented as

$$FT(\theta) = \sum_{j=-s}^s C_j \cos(j\theta), \qquad
s = \tfrac{m-1}{2}$$

θ runs from 0 to 180 degrees, after which the function merely repeats itself. The plot for a 9-point quadratic/cubic smoothing function is typical. At very low angle, the plot is almost flat, meaning that low-frequency components of the data will be virtually unchanged by the smoothing operation. As the angle increases the value decreases so that higher frequency components are more and more attenuated. This shows that the convolution filter can be described as a low-pass filter: the noise that is removed is primarily high-frequency noise and low-frequency noise passes through the filter. Some high-frequency noise components are attenuated more than others, as shown by undulations in the Fourier transform at large angles. This can give rise to small oscillations in the smoothed data and phase reversal, i.e., high-frequency oscillations in the data get inverted by Savitzky–Golay filtering.

=== Convolution and correlation ===
Convolution affects the correlation between errors in the data. The effect of convolution can be expressed as a linear transformation.

$$Y_j\ = \sum_{i=-s}^s C_i\, y_{j+i}, \qquad
s = \tfrac{m-1}{2}$$

By the law of error propagation, the variance-covariance matrix of the data, A will be transformed into B according to
$$\mathbf B=\mathbf C \mathbf A\mathbf C^\mathsf{T}$$
To see how this applies in practice, consider the effect of a 3-point moving average on the first three calculated points, Y_{2} − Y_{4}, assuming that the data points have equal variance and that there is no correlation between them. A will be an identity matrix multiplied by a constant, σ^{2}, the variance at each point.

$$\begin{align}
\mathbf B &= \frac{\sigma^2}{9}
\begin{pmatrix}
1 & 1 & 1 & 0 & 0\\
0 & 1 & 1 & 1 & 0\\
0 & 0 & 1 & 1 & 1
\end{pmatrix}
\begin{pmatrix}
1 & 0 & 0 & 0 & 0\\
0 & 1 & 0 & 0 & 0\\
0 & 0 & 1 & 0 & 0\\
0 & 0 & 0 & 1 & 0\\
0 & 0 & 0 & 0 & 1
\end{pmatrix}
\begin{pmatrix}
1 & 0 & 0 \\
1 & 1 & 0 \\
1 & 1 & 1 \\
0 & 1 & 1 \\
0 & 0 & 1
\end{pmatrix} \\
&= \frac{\sigma^2}{9}
\begin{pmatrix}
3 & 2 & 1 \\
2 & 3 & 2 \\
1 & 2 & 3
\end{pmatrix}
\end{align}$$

In this case the correlation coefficients,
$$\rho_{ij}=\frac{B_{ij}}{\sqrt{B_{ii} B_{jj}}},\ (i\ne j)$$
between calculated points i and j will be

$$\rho_{i,i+1} = {2\over 3} = 0.66, \; \rho_{i,i+2} = {1\over 3} = 0.33$$

In general, the calculated values are correlated even when the observed values are not correlated. The correlation extends over m − 1 calculated points at a time.

==== Multipass filters ====
To illustrate the effect of multipassing on the noise and correlation of a set of data, consider the effects of a second pass of a 3-point moving average filter. For the second pass (Note: The same result is obtained with one pass of the equivalent filter with coefficients (1/9, 2/9, 3/9, 2/9, 1/9) and an identity variance-covariance matrix)

$$\begin{align}
\mathbf{C}\mathbf{B}\mathbf{C}^\mathsf{T} &= \frac{\sigma^2}{81}
\begin{pmatrix}
1 & 1 & 1 & 0 & 0 \\
0 & 1 & 1 & 1 & 0 \\
0 & 0 & 1 & 1 & 1
\end{pmatrix}
\begin{pmatrix}
3 & 2 & 1 & 0 & 0 \\
2 & 3 & 2 & 0 & 0 \\
1 & 2 & 3 & 0 & 0 \\
0 & 0 & 0 & 0 & 0 \\
0 & 0 & 0 & 0 & 0
\end{pmatrix}
\begin{pmatrix}
1 & 0 & 0 \\
1 & 1 & 0 \\
1 & 1 & 1 \\
0 & 1 & 1 \\
0 & 0 & 1
\end{pmatrix} \\
&= \frac{\sigma^2}{81}
\begin{pmatrix}
19 & 16 & 10 & 4  & 1 \\
16 & 19 & 16 & 10 & 4 \\
10 & 16 & 19 & 16 & 10 \\
4  & 10 & 16 & 19 & 16 \\
1  & 4  & 10 & 16 & 19
\end{pmatrix}
\end{align}$$
After two passes, the standard deviation of the central point has decreased to $\sqrt{\tfrac{19}{81}}\sigma = 0.48\sigma$, compared to 0.58σ for one pass. The noise reduction is a little less than would be obtained with one pass of a 5-point moving average which, under the same conditions, would result in the smoothed points having the smaller standard deviation of 0.45σ.

Correlation now extends over a span of 4 sequential points with correlation coefficients

$$\begin{align}
\rho_{i,i+1} &= \frac{16}{19} = 0.84, &
\rho_{i,i+2} &= \frac{10}{19} = 0.53, \\[1ex]
\rho_{i,i+3} &= \frac{4}{19} = 0.21, &
\rho_{i,i+4} &= \frac{1}{19} = 0.05
\end{align}$$

The advantage obtained by performing two passes with the narrower smoothing function is that it introduces less distortion into the calculated data.

== Comparison with other filters and alternatives ==
Compared with other smoothing filters, e.g. convolution with a Gaussian or multi-pass moving-average filtering, Savitzky–Golay filters have an initially flatter response and sharper cutoff in the frequency domain, especially for high orders of the fit polynomial (see frequency characteristics). For data with limited signal bandwidth, this means that Savitzky–Golay filtering can provide better signal-to-noise ratio than many other filters; e.g., peak heights of spectra are better preserved than for other filters with similar noise suppression. Disadvantages of the Savitzky–Golay filters are comparably poor suppression of some high frequencies (poor stopband suppression) and artifacts when using polynomial fits for the first and last points.

Alternative smoothing methods that share the advantages of Savitzky–Golay filters and mitigate at least some of their disadvantages are Savitzky–Golay filters with properly chosen alternative fitting weights, Whittaker–Henderson smoothing and Hodrick–Prescott filter (equivalent methods closely related to smoothing splines), and convolution with a windowed sinc function.

== Implementations in programming languages ==
=== MATLAB ===
- sgolayfilt from Signal Processing Toolbox. Available since before version R2006b.

=== Python ===
- flatten from module Lightkurve. Lightkurve is the official library for analysis of Kepler & TESS Telescope data.
- scipy.signal.savgol_filter from module SciPy. SciPy is a robust library widely used for scientific computing in the academic community.

== See also ==
- Kernel smoother – Different terminology for many of the same processes, used in statistics
- Local regression — the LOESS and LOWESS methods
- Numerical differentiation – Application to differentiation of functions
- Smoothing spline
- Stencil (numerical analysis) – Application to the solution of differential equations
- Hodrick–Prescott filter
- Kalman filter

== Appendix ==
=== Tables of selected convolution coefficients ===
Consider a set of data points $(x_j, y_j)_{1 \le j \le n}$. The Savitzky–Golay tables refer to the case that the step $x_j - x_{j - 1}$ is constant, h. Examples of the use of the so-called convolution coefficients, with a cubic polynomial and a window size, m, of 5 points are as follows.

Smoothing
$Y_j = \frac{1}{35} \left(-3 y_{j - 2} + 12 y_{j - 1} + 17 y_j + 12 y_{j + 1} -3 y_{j + 2}\right)$ ;
1st derivative
$Y'_j = \frac{1}{12h} \left(y_{j - 2} - 8 y_{j - 1} + 0 y_j + 8 y_{j + 1} - y_{j + 2}\right)$ ;
2nd derivative
$$Y''_j = \frac{1}{7h^2} \left(2 y_{j - 2} - y_{j - 1} - 2 y_j - y_{j + 1} + 2 y_{j + 2}\right)$$.

Selected values of the convolution coefficients for polynomials of degree 1, 2, 3, 4 and 5 are given in the following tables (Note: More extensive tables and the method to calculate additional coefficients were originally provided by Savitzky and Golay.) The values were calculated using the PASCAL code provided in Gorry.

Coefficients for smoothing
Polynomial Degree	quadratic or cubic 2 or 3			quartic or quintic 4 or 5	
Window size	5	7	9	7	9
−4			−21		15
−3		−2	14	5	−55
−2	−3	3	39	−30	30
−1	12	6	54	75	135
0	17	7	59	131	179
1	12	6	54	75	135
2	−3	3	39	−30	30
3		−2	14	5	−55
4			−21		15
Normalisation	35	21	231	231	429

Coefficients for 1st derivative
Polynomial Degree	linear or quadratic 1 or 2				cubic or quartic 3 or 4		
Window size	3	5	7	9	5	7	9
−4				−4			86
−3			−3	−3		22	−142
−2		−2	−2	−2	1	−67	−193
−1	-1	−1	−1	−1	−8	−58	−126
0	0	0	0	0	0	0	0
1	1	1	1	1	8	58	126
2		2	2	2	−1	67	193
3			3	3		−22	142
4				4			−86
Normalisation	2	10	28	60	12	252	1,188

Coefficients for 2nd derivative
Polynomial Degree	quadratic or cubic 2 or 3			quartic or quintic 4 or 5		
Window size	5	7	9	5	7	9
−4			28			−126
−3		5	7		−13	371
−2	2	0	−8	−1	67	151
−1	−1	−3	−17	16	−19	−211
0	−2	−4	−20	−30	−70	−370
1	−1	−3	−17	16	−19	−211
2	2	0	−8	−1	67	151
3		5	7		−13	371
4			28			−126
Normalisation	7	42	462	12	132	1716

Coefficients for 3rd derivative
Polynomial Degree	cubic or quartic 3 or 4			quintic or sextic 5 or 6	
Window size	5	7	9	7	9
−4			−14		100
−3		−1	7	1	−457
−2	−1	1	13	−8	256
−1	2	1	9	13	459
0	0	0	0	0	0
1	−2	−1	−9	−13	−459
2	1	−1	−13	8	−256
3		1	−7	−1	457
4			14		−100
Normalisation	2	6	198	8	1144

Coefficients for 4th derivative
Polynomial Degree	quartic or quintic 4 or 5	
Window size	7	9
−4		14
−3	3	−21
−2	−7	−11
−1	1	9
0	6	18
1	1	9
2	-7	−11
3	3	−21
4		14
Normalisation	11	143
