= Stephen Taylor (economist) =

Stephen John Taylor (born 1954) is an emeritus professor of Finance at Lancaster University Management School, an authority on stochastic volatility models and option prices, a researcher in the areas of financial econometrics and mathematical finance, and an author who has published academic books and influential learned papers in Mathematical Finance, the Journal of Financial and Quantitative Analysis, the Journal of Econometrics and several other academic journals.

== Early years ==
Stephen John Taylor was born in 1954 and educated at Bedford Modern School, Trinity College, Cambridge (BA, Mathematics) and the University of Lancaster (MA and PhD, Operational Research).

== Career ==
Taylor has spent his academic career at Lancaster University where he has been Lecturer in Operational Research (1977–88), Lecturer in Finance (1988–89), Reader in Finance (1989–93) and professor of Finance from 1993 until retiring in 2020.

Taylor's research interests in the decade from 2010 to 2020 included one-minute stock index returns, jumps in asset prices, model-free measures of volatility and forward-looking information revealed by option prices.

He has been an associate editor of several journals including the Journal of Banking and Finance and Mathematical Finance.

He has also been a Visiting Professor at several universities around the world including Beijing University, National Taiwan University, Monash University, University of Queensland, University of Canterbury, University of Auckland, Institute for Advanced Studies (Vienna), the Norwegian University of Science and Technology and the University of Coimbra.

== Selected works ==
=== Books ===
- S.J. Taylor, 1986 & 2008, Modelling Financial Time Series, John Wiley & Sons (first edition) and World Scientific Publishing (second edition)
- R.M.C. Guimaraes, B.G. Kingsman and S.J. Taylor (editors), 1989, A Reappraisal of the Efficiency of Financial Markets, Springer-Verlag
- S.J. Taylor, 2005, Asset Price Dynamics, Volatility and Prediction, Princeton University Press

=== Most highly cited papers ===
- S.J. Taylor, 1982 & 2005, Financial returns modelled by the product of two stochastic processes …., reprinted in Stochastic Volatility: Selected Readings, Neil Shephard editor, Oxford University Press, 60–82
- S. Poon and S.J. Taylor, 1992, Stock returns and volatility: an empirical study of the UK stock market, Journal of Banking and Finance 16, 37–59
- S.J. Taylor, 1994, Modelling stochastic volatility: a review and comparative study, Mathematical Finance 4, 183–204
- S.J. Taylor and X. Xu, 1997, The incremental volatility information in one million foreign exchange quotations, Journal of Empirical Finance 4, 317–340
- B.J. Blair, S. Poon and S.J. Taylor, 2001, Forecasting S&P 100 volatility: the incremental information content of implied volatilities and high-frequency index returns, Journal of Econometrics, 105, 5–26
- S. Pong, M.B. Shackleton, S.J. Taylor and X. Xu, 2004, Forecasting currency volatility: a comparison of implied volatilities and AR(FI)MA models, Journal of Banking and Finance 28, 2541–2563
- Sohnke M. Bartram, S.J. Taylor and Y. Wang, 2002, The Euro and European financial market dependence, Journal of Banking and Finance, 31, 1461–1481
- Y. Wang, A. Keswani and S.J. Taylor, 2006, The relationships between sentiment, returns and volatility, International Journal of Forecasting 22, 109–123

=== Recent topics ===
- M.B. Shackleton, S.J. Taylor and P. Yu, 2010, A multi-horizon comparison of density forecasts for the S&P 500 using index returns and option prices, Journal of Banking and Finance 34, 2678–2693
- D. Gilder, M.B. Shackleton and S.J. Taylor, 2014, Cojumps in stock prices: empirical evidence, Journal of Banking and Finance 40, 443–459
- S.J. Taylor, C. Tzeng and M. Widdicks, 2018, Information about price and volatility jumps inferred from option prices, Journal of Futures Markets 38, 1206–1226
