= Jensen Prize =

The Jensen Prize is an annual prize given to authors with the best corporate finance and organizations research papers published in the Journal of Financial Economics. The award is named after Michael Jensen, a co-founding editor of the journal.

== Details ==
Each year personal and student subscribers to the Journal of Financial Economics vote for the best paper in each of two categories after the journal's editorial office has enumerated all articles and assigned them to either the corporate finance and organizations area or the capital markets and asset pricing areas. Each subscriber may use one vote for each category. Currently the first prize in each category is $5,000 and the second prize is $2,500. The 2007 voting occurred from February 1 - May 31, 2007.

== Winners ==
The following table is a complete list of past winners of the Jensen Prize:

Paper	Author(s)	Year	Issue
"The complexity of compensation contracts" "The decline of takeovers and disciplinary managerial turnover"	Stacey R. Kole; Wayne H. Mikkelson and M. Megan Partch	1997	January; May
"Risk management, capital budgeting, and capital structure policy for financial institutions: an integrated approach"	Kenneth A. Froot and Jeremy C. Stein	1998	January
"The determinants and implications of corporate cash holdings"	Tim Opler, Lee Pinkowitz, René M. Stulz and Rohan Williamson	1999	April
"On the optimality of resetting executive stock options"	Viral V. Acharya, Kose John and Rangarajan K. Sundaram	2000	July
"The theory and practice of corporate finance: Evidence from the field"	John R. Graham and Campbell Harvey	2001	May/June
"Does diversification destroy value? Evidence from industry shocks"	Owen A. Lamont and Christopher Polk	2002	January
"Stock market driven acquisitions"	Andrei Shleifer and Robert W. Vishny	2003	December
"Are dividends disappearing? Dividend concentration and the consolidation of earnings"	Harry DeAngelo, Linda DeAngelo, and Douglas J. Skinner	2004	June
"Payout policy in the 21st century "	Alon Brav, John R. Graham, Roni Michaely, and Campbell R. Harvey	2005	September
"Tax shelters and corporate debt policy"	John R. Graham and Alan L. Tucker	2006	September
"Does backdating explain the stock price pattern around executive stock option grants?"	Randall A. Heron and Erik Lie	2007	February
"Why do private acquirers pay so little compared to public acquirers?"	Leonce L. Bargeron, Frederik P. Schlingemann, René M. Stulz, and Chad J. Zutter	2008	September
"Share issuance and cross-sectional returns: International evidence"	R. David McLean, Jeffrey Pontiff, and Akiko Watanabe	2009	October
"The marketing of seasoned equity offerings"	Xiaohui Gao and Jay Ritter	2010	July
"Ownership structure and the cost of corporate borrowing"	Lin Chen, Yue Ma, Paul Malatesta, and Yuhai Xuan	2011	April
"Securitized banking and the run on repo"	Gary Gorton and Andrew Metrick	2012	June
"Managerial attitudes and corporate actions"	John Graham, Campbell R. Harvey, and Manju Puri	2013	July
"Firm boundaries matter: Evidence from conglomerates and R&D activity"	Amit Seru	2014	February
"Target revaluation after failed takeover attempts - Cash versus stock"	John R. Graham, Mark T. Leary, and Michael R. Roberts	2015	December
"The ownership and trading of debt claims in Chapter 11 restructurings"	Ulrike M. Malmendier, Marcus Opp, and Farzad Saidi	2016	January
"The U.S. listing gap"	Craig Doidge, G. Andrew Karolyi, and René M. Stulz	2017	March
"How does hedge fund activism reshape corporate innovation?"	Alon Brav, Wei Jiang, Song Ma, and Xuan Tian	2018	November
What's in a (school) name? Racial discrimination in higher education bond markets	Casey Dougal, Pengjie Gao, William J. Mayew, and Christopher A. Parsons	2019	December
How do venture capitalists make decisions?	Paul Gompers, Will Gornall, Steven Kaplan and Ilya A. Strebulaev	2020	January
Does common ownership really increase firm coordination?	Katharina Lewellen and Michelle Lowry	2021	July
How much should we trust staggered difference-in-differences estimates?	Andrew Baker, David F. Larcker, and Charles C.Y. Yang	2022	May
Mortgage prepayment, race, and monetary policy	Kristopher Gerardi, Paul S. Willen and David Hao Zhang	2023	March
Refinancing cross-subsidies in the mortgage market	Jack Fisher, Alessandro Gavazza, Lu Liu, Tarun Ramadorai, Jagdish Tripathy	2024	August
Data Sales and Data Dilution	Ernest Liu, Song Ma, Laura Veldkamp	2025	July

== See also ==
- List of economics awards
