= Gaston Gelos =

German-Uruguayan economist

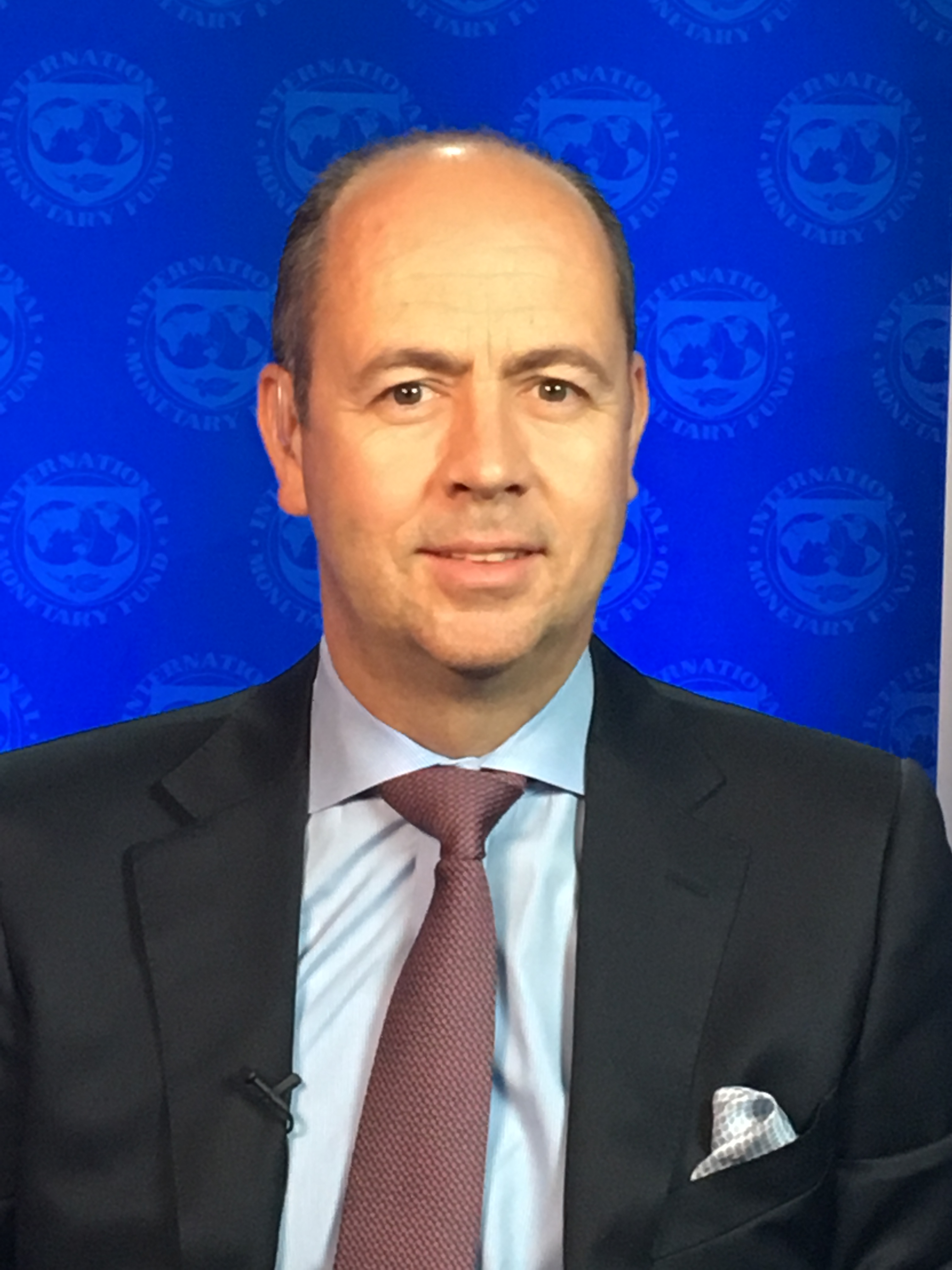
- Born: January 8, 1969 (age 57); Montevideo, Uruguay

Academic background
- Education: University of Bonn, Yale University

Academic work
- Discipline: International finance, Macroeconomics
- Institutions: Bank for International Settlements; International Monetary Fund
- Website: Information at IDEAS / RePEc

Gaston Gelos (born Rafael Gaston Gelos) is a German-Uruguayan economist, who serves as Deputy Head of the Monetary and Economic Department and Head of Financial Stability Policy at the Bank for International Settlements (BIS). His work focuses on mainly on financial stability, financial intermediation and international finance. He previously held several senior positions at the International Monetary Fund (IMF) and Bank for International Settlements.

== Career ==
Gelos joined the International Monetary Fund in 1998 and spent his initial years there in the Research Department before working on various countries in the Western Hemisphere Department. He was the resident representative for the IMF in Montevideo, Uruguay (2005-2007) and Buenos Aires, Argentina (2007-2010), and Mission Chief for Nicaragua.

In 2013 he became the head of the Global Financial Stability Analysis Division, where he led the work on the analytical chapters of the Global Financial Stability Report. In 2017, Gelos lead the Financial Sector Assessment Program (FSAP) for Japan.

Between 2017 and 2022, he headed the Monetary and Macroprudential Policies Division, leading research and policy work on monetary- and macroprudential policies and overseeing global technical assistance efforts in these areas. Prior to his move to the BIS, he served as mission chief for Mexico (2022-23).

=== Research ===
Gelos' research covers topics including capital flows, banking, financial stability, and monetary policy and has been cited in The Economist, Financial Times, Reuters, economic blogs, and global newspapers. His most cited work discusses the role of transparency in shaping international investor behavior. Gelos is a Center for Economic and Policy Research (CEPR) research fellow.

== Selected publications ==
- Gelos, Gaston; Rime, Bertrand; Tracol, Kevin (2026). "Bank executive compensation and risk-taking". BIS Quarterly Review. Bank for International Settlements.
- Aquilina, Matteo; Garavito, Fabian; Gelos, Gaston; Lewrick, Ulf; Packer, Frank; Pinter, Gabor; Sushko, Vladyslav; Todorov, Karamfil (2025). "The transformation of the life insurance industry: systemic risks and policy challenges". BIS Papers. Bank for International Settlements.
- Alam, Zohair; Alter, Adrian; Eiseman, Jesse; Gelos, Gaston; Kang, Heedon; Narita, Machiko; Nier, Erlend; Wang, Naixi (2025). "Digging Deeper—Evidence on the Effects of Macroprudential Policies from a New Database". Journal of Money, Credit and Banking. 57 (5). Blackwell Publishing: 1135–1166.
- Gelos, Gaston; Gornicka, Lucyna; Koepke, Robin; Sahay, Ratna; Sgherri, Silvia (2022-01-01). "Capital flows at risk: Taming the ebbs and flows". Journal of International Economics. 134: 103555. doi:10.1016/j.jinteco.2021.103555. ISSN 0022-1996.
- Brandao-Marques, Luis; Gelos, Gaston; Ichiue, Hibiki; Oura, Hiroko (2022-11). "Changes in the global investor base and the stability of portfolio flows to emerging markets". Journal of Banking & Finance. 144: 106615. doi:10.1016/j.jbankfin.2022.106615. ISSN 0378-4266.
- Gelos, R. Gaston; Sahay, Ratna; Sandleris, Guido (2011-03-01). "Sovereign borrowing by developing countries: What determines market access?". Journal of International Economics. 83 (2): 243–254. doi:10.1016/j.jinteco.2010.11.007. ISSN 0022-1996.
- Broner, Fernando A.; Gelos, R. Gaston; Reinhart, Carmen M. (2006). "When in peril, retrench: Testing the portfolio channel of contagion". Journal of International Economics. Vol. 69 (1), pp. 203–230. doi:10.1016/j.jinteco.2005.05.004. ISSN 0022-1996.
- Gelos, R. Gaston; Wei, Shang-Jin (2005). "Transparency and International Portfolio Holdings". The Journal of Finance. 60 (6): 2987–3020. doi:10.1111/j.1540-6261.2005.00823.x. ISSN 1540-6261.
