= Yael Hochberg =

American economist

- יעל הוכברג
- Education: Technion-Israel Institute of Technology; Stanford University
- Occupation: Economist
- Employer: Rice University

Yael Hochberg (Hebrew: יעל הוכברג) is an American economist and the Ralph S. O'Connor Professor of entrepreneurship and finance at Rice University.

== Education and career ==
Hochberg graduated from the Technion-Israel Institute of Technology, where she earned her MA in economics, and PhD in finance from the Stanford University. Her research and teaching interests include entrepreneurship, innovation, venture capital, accelerators, networks, and corporate governance. She serves as the Head of the Entrepreneurship Initiative at Rice University and as Academic Director of the Rice Alliance for Technology and Entrepreneurship.

Hochberg served the faculty at Kellogg School of Management at Northwestern University and the Johnson School of Management of the Cornell University before becoming the Head of the Entrepreneurship Initiative at Rice University, and Academic Director of the Rice Alliance. Hochberg simultaneously holds a Research Affiliate position at the MIT Sloan School of Management, where she was previously a visiting faculty member. She is also a visiting faculty member at the University of Chicago Booth School of Business.

Outside of her university career, Hochberg has held positions in entrepreneurship firms including a Research Associate at the National Bureau of Economic Research, Managing Director of the Seed Accelerator Rankings Project, and an Associate Editor of Journal of Banking and Finance and the Journal of Empirical Finance.

== Awards ==
Hochberg has been recognized for her contributions. Poets&Quants named her among the 40 Under 40 best business school professors in 2015. She was the recipient of the Ewing Marion Kauffman Prize Medal for Distinguished Research in Entrepreneurship in 2016.

== Selected publications ==
- Hochberg, Yael V. (September 6, 2011). "Venture Capital and Corporate Governance in the Newly Public Firm". Review of Finance. 16 (2). SSRN 474542.
- Hochberg, Yael; Ljungqvist, Alexander; Lu, Yang (September 2005). "Whom You Know Matters: Venture Capital Networks and Investment Performance". Journal of Finance. 62 (1). SSRN 631941.
- Hochberg, Yael V.; Lindsey, Laura Anne (April 28, 2009). "Incentives, Targeting and Firm Performance: An Analysis of Non-Executive Stock Options". Review of Financial Studies. 23 (11). SSRN 1267393.
- Hochberg, Yael V.; Serrano, Carlos J.; Ziedonis, Rosemarie Ham (October 7, 2014). "Patent Collateral, Investor Commitment, and the Market for Venture Lending". Journal of Financial Economics. 130 (1). SSRN 2506911.
- Aggarwal, Dhruv; Eldar, Ofer; Hochberg, Yael V.; Litov, Lubomir P. (November 23, 2021). "The Rise of Dual-Class Stock IPOs". Journal of Financial Economics. 144 (1). SSRN 3690670.
- Hochberg, Yael V.; Ljungqvist, Alexander; Lu, Yang (June 30, 2009). "Networking as a Barrier to Entry and the Competitive Supply of Venture Capital". Journal of Finance. 65 (3). SSRN 1300775.
- Hochberg, Yael V.; Ljungqvist, Alexander; Vissing-Jorgensen, Annette (October 16, 2012). "Informational Hold-Up and Performance Persistence in Venture Capital". Review of Financial Studies. 27 (1). SSRN 1260496.
- Hochberg, Yael V.; Lindsey, Laura Anne; Westerfield, Mark M. (February 1, 2015). "Resource Accumulation Through Economic Ties: Evidence from Venture Capital". Journal of Financial Economics. 118 (2): 245–267. doi:10.1016/j.jfineco.2015.06.008. SSRN 1855764.
- Ang, Andrew; Gu, Li; Hochberg, Yael V. (October 25, 2005). "Is IPO Underperformance a Peso Problem?". Journal of Financial and Quantitative Analysis. 42 (3). SSRN 527642.
- Hochberg, Yael V.; Sapienza, Paola; Vissing-Jorgensen, Annette (January 25, 2007). "A Lobbying Approach to Evaluating the Sarbanes-Oxley Act of 2002". Journal of Accounting Research. 47 (2). SSRN 891485.
