= Scatterplot smoothing =

In statistics, several scatterplot smoothing methods are available to fit a function through the points of a scatterplot to best represent the relationship between the variables.

Scatterplots may be smoothed by fitting a line to the data points in a diagram. This line attempts to display the non-random component of the association between the variables in a 2D scatter plot. Smoothing attempts to separate the non-random behaviour in the data from the random fluctuations, removing or reducing these fluctuations, and allows prediction of the response based value of the explanatory variable.

Smoothing is normally accomplished by using any one of the techniques mentioned below.

- A straight line (simple linear regression)
- A quadratic or a polynomial curve
- Local regression
- Smoothing splines

The smoothing curve is chosen so as to provide the best fit in some sense, often defined as the fit that results in the minimum sum of the squared errors (a least squares criterion).

== See also ==
- Additive model
- Generalized additive model
- Smoothing
