= HP filter =

HP filter may refer to:

- Hodrick–Prescott filter, a mathematical tool used in macroeconomics
- High-pass filter, an electronic filter

== See also ==
- HEPA filter
