= Geert Bekaert (economist) =

Belgian economist

- Awards: William Sharpe Award (2012)

Academic background
- Education: University of Ghent; Northwestern University
- Doctoral advisor: Robert J. Hodrick

Academic work
- Discipline: Economics
- Sub-discipline: International finance
- Institutions: Stanford Business School; Columbia Business School

Geert Bekaert is a Belgian economist. He is a professor at Columbia Business School and from 2015 until early 2025 was the managing editor of the Journal of Banking and Finance.

== Biography ==
Bekaert received his B.A. from Ghent University and Ph.D. from Northwestern University under Robert J. Hodrick. He began his academic career at the Stanford Graduate School of Business before joining the faculty of Columbia Business School in 1999. He held the Leon G. Cooperman Professorship of Finance and Economics until 2019. Bekaert's research focused on international finance and foreign exchange market efficiency. As of June 2025, his articles have been cited over 55,000 times on Google Scholar.

Bekaert is the co-recipient of a William Sharpe Award in 2012 from the Journal of Financial and Quantitative Analysis. He has been a research associate of the National Bureau of Economic Research since 1999.
