= John Graham (economist) =

American financial economist (born 1961)

- Born: June 1, 1961 (age 65); Beaumont, Texas, U.S.

Academic background
- Education: College of William and Mary (B.A.); Virginia Commonwealth University (M.A.); Duke University (Ph.D.)

Academic work
- Discipline: Corporate finance
- Institutions: Duke University Fuqua School of Business (1997–present); University of Utah (1994–1997)
- Awards: Brattle Prize; Jensen Prize; Fellow of the Financial Management Association

John R. Graham (born June 1, 1961) is an American financial economist, a professor at the Duke University Fuqua School of Business, a research associate for the NBER, and a regular guest commentator on CNBC. A Phi Beta Kappa winner, Graham has accumulated a lengthy list of award-winning research papers.

== Professional career ==
Graham obtained a B.A. College of William and Mary in 1983, an M.A. from Virginia Commonwealth University in 1988 and a Ph.D. from Duke University in 1994. As a scholar he was elected to the Phi Beta Kappa honor society as an undergraduate and to the Alpha Iota Delta, Beta Gamma Sigma, and Phi Kappa Phi honor societies as a graduate student. Upon completion of his Ph.D., he obtained a position as an assistant professor of finance at Utah University teaching undergraduates, M.B.A. students, and Ph.D. students.

In 1997, Graham accepted a position as an assistant professor of finance at Duke University's Fuqua School of Business. He was promoted to associate professor in 1999 and full professor in 2004. In 1998 and 1999, he had 3 research papers nominated for either the annual Smith Breeden Prize as the best published in the Journal of Finance or the annual Brattle Prize as best corporate finance paper published in the Journal of Finance. In 2000, he won the Brattle Prize for "How Big Are the Tax Benefits of Debt?". In 2001, he won the Jensen Prize for the best corporate finance paper published in the Journal of Financial Economics for "The Theory and Practice of Corporate Finance: Evidence from the Field" (with Campbell Harvey). He again won the Jensen Prize in 2005 for "Payout Policy in the 21st Century" (with Alon Brav, Campbell Harvey and Roni Michaely) and in 2006 for "Tax Shelters and Corporate Debt Policy" (with Alan Tucker).

Graham was also the co-editor of the Journal of Finance for six years, President of the Western Finance Association, and was a member of the board of directors of the American Finance Association. He will be the President in 2021 of the American Finance Association. Graham serves as director of the "Duke/CFO Global Business Outlook" survey. As the overseer of the survey, he is quoted in a variety of mass media, such as The Wall Street Journal.

== Personal life ==
Graham has been married since 1984 and has three children.
