= Leslie Young (economist) =

New Zealand–Chinese economist (1949–2022)

- Born: 30 June 1949; Guangzhou, China
- Died: 5 April 2022 (aged 72); London, England

Academic background
- Education: University of Oxford
- Thesis: (1970)

Academic work
- Discipline: Economics
- Institutions: University of Canterbury; University of Texas at Austin; Chinese University of Hong Kong; Cheung Kong Graduate School of Business

Leslie Young (Chinese: 楊瑞輝; 30 June 1949 – 5 April 2022) was a New Zealand–Chinese economist. His interests included uncertainty in international trade, and the influence of culture and political economy on economic performance. He was the executive director of the Asia Pacific Institute of Business at The Chinese University of Hong Kong from 1993 until his retirement, and was a long-serving member of the American Economic Review editorial board.

== Early life and education ==
Born in Guangzhou, China, on 30 June 1949, Young was the son of Young Yuk Foon and Lowe Soo Yee. He moved with his family to New Zealand at the age of two years, and settled in Levin where his family became market gardeners. He was educated at Horowhenua College, excelling academically, and went on to study at Victoria University of Wellington when he was 16 years old. He completed a Bachelor of Science (BSc) degree in two years, and the following year gained a BSc with first-class honours in mathematics. He then completed a Master of Science degree with distinction in mathematics, supervised by Wilf Malcolm, in August 1969, while waiting to take up several postgraduate scholarships at the University of Oxford. He finished his doctoral thesis in mathematics at Oxford within a year, and then spent another year writing essays at the urging of Nicholas Stern and James Mirrlees, who introduced him to economics, until he had fulfilled the length of study required for the DPhil. His thesis won the senior mathematics prize at Oxford for the best dissertation of its year.

Young became a naturalised New Zealand citizen on 5 September 1968. He married Lee McNab, and the couple had one child.

== Career ==
Young was a junior research fellow in economics at Lincoln College, Oxford, before joining the faculty of the Department of Economics at the University of Canterbury in New Zealand in 1975. He moved to the University of Texas at Austin (UTA) in 1983, where he was a professor of economics and the V. F. Neuhaus Professor in Finance. In 1992, he became professor of finance at the Chinese University of Hong Kong, and the following year he was appointed executive director of the Asia Pacific Institute of Business. In 2013, he was appointed professor of economics at the Cheung Kong Graduate School of Business in Beijing. Young held visiting professorships at the Massachusetts Institute of Technology, the University of California Berkeley, and the Australian National University. He served four terms on the editorial board of the American Economic Review, and was on the Pacific Economic Review editorial board from 1996 to 2004.

Young was described as "an outstanding economist by any yardstick" by the New Zealand Association of Economics. He wrote papers on the impact of uncertainty on international trade and finance, and the effects on welfare of trade restrictions. With Stephen Magee from UTA and William A. Brock, he investigated the political economy of trade policy, leading to their book, Black hole tariffs and endogenous redistribution theory, published in 1989 by Cambridge University Press. Young was also interested in governance, and the interactions of culture, economic behaviour and legal processes, as exemplified by his papers comparing the economies of China and India, and also Asian and Western economies.

Young died in London on 5 April 2022.

== Honours and awards ==
In 2003, Young was the first person to be conferred with an honorary Doctor of Commerce degree by Victoria University of Wellington. In 2009, he was awarded an honorary doctorate by the Estonian School of Business. Young was made a Distinguished Fellow of the New Zealand Association of Economists in 2012.

== Selected publications ==
- Young, Leslie (1979). "Ranking optimal tariffs and quotas for a large country under uncertainty". Journal of International Economics. 9 (2): 249–264. doi:10.1016/0022-1996(79)90007-2.
- Magee, Stephen P.; Brock, William A.; Young, Leslie (1989). Black hole tariffs and endogenous redistribution theory. Cambridge University Press. ISBN 9780521377003.
- Faccio, Mara; Lang, Larry H. P.; Young, Leslie (2005). "Dividends and expropriation". In Lang, Larry H. P. (ed.). Governance and expropriation. Cheltenham: Edward Elgar.
- Young, Leslie (2016). "Financial reform and change in Asian business systems". In Whitley, Richard; Zhang, Xiaoke (eds.). Changing Asian business systems: globalization, socio-political change, and economic organization. Oxford University Press.
