= Malcolm Baker =

American rower and economist

- Born: 1970 (age 55–56)
- Education: Brown University (BA); St Edmund's College, Cambridge (MPhil); Harvard University (PhD)
- Known for: 1992 Olympic Rower
- Awards: Brattle Prize
- Scientific career
- Fields: Finance
- Workplaces: Harvard University

Malcolm P. Baker (born c. 1970) is a professor of finance, and a former Olympic rower.

== Education ==
Baker graduated from St. Albans School and began rowing at Brown University. As a Freshman he was on a National Championship team and he became the 1991 Outstanding Male Athlete. He also earned a bachelor's degree in applied mathematics and economics at Brown in 1992. He raced for the United States National Rowing Team in the 1990 and 1991 World Championships and the 1992 Summer Olympics. At the Olympics his eight-man team finished fourth. Baker earned a M.Phil. in finance from St Edmund's College, Cambridge in 1993, and a PhD in business economics from Harvard University in 2000. At Cambridge, he helped the crew team defeat the University of Oxford in The Boat Race for only the second time in eighteen contests.

== Professional career ==
Prior to graduate study he was a senior associate at Charles River Associates, and during graduate study he served as a teaching fellow at Harvard University. He has been on the faculty at the Harvard Business School since earning his PhD in 2000. He was an assistant professor from 2001 to 2004, associate professor from 2004 to 2007 and has been a full professor since.

As a professor he has written numerous case studies and has been widely published. He has served as associate editor for the Journal of Finance and the Review of Financial Studies. During his career he has been a three-time Brattle Prize nominee and a two-time Smith Breeden Prize nominee. In 2002, "Market Timing and Capital Structure" (co-authored with Jeffrey Wurgler) was recognised with the Brattle Prize by the American Finance Association as the best corporate finance research paper published in the Journal of Finance that year. In that same year, he and co-author Jeremy Stein, attributed low abnormal returns following high liquidity to the "dumb investor effect." Baker also serves as a faculty research fellow in the corporate finance program at the National Bureau of Economic Research. He has served as an independent director of board of directors of TAL International Group, Inc. and of each of its US subsidiaries since 12 September 2006,.

For his work as a co-author (with Lubomir Litov, Jessica A. Wachter, and Jeffrey Wurgler) of "Can Mutual Fund Managers Pick Stocks? Evidence from Their Trades Prior to Earnings Announcements" in the October 2010 Journal of Financial and Quantitative Analysis, he earned the William F. Sharpe Award for Best Paper in 2011 for his paper.

Baker is also Director of Research at Acadian Asset Management.

== Personal ==
Baker is married with children.

== See also ==
- List of Cambridge University Boat Race crews
