= William Sharpe Award =

The William F. Sharpe Award for Scholarship in Financial Research is an award given each year to the author of the research article published in the Journal of Financial and Quantitative Analysis (JFQA) which has made the most important contribution to financial economics. The award is dedicated to William F. Sharpe, a financial economist at Stanford University and winner of the 1990 Nobel Memorial Prize in Economic Sciences, and was established 1999. It is affirmed with a $5000 reward financed donated by the Litzenberger Family Foundation, Weyerhaeuser Company Foundation, William Alberts, Norman Metcalfe, and the University of Washington School of Business Administration, among others. Nominees for the William F. Sharpe Award are voted for by JFQA readers and the journal's associate editors, and the managing editors of the journal select a winner among the nominees.

== List of JFQA William F. Sharpe Award winners ==
The following table displays a list of the winners of the William F. Sharpe Award along with information on the article for which it was received.

| Paper | Author(s) | Year | Issue |
|---|---|---|---|
| “Social Transmission Bias and Investor Behavior” | Bing Han, David Hirshleifer, and Johan Walden | 2022 | February 2022 |
| “Granularity of Corporate Debt” | Jaewon Choi, Dirk Hackbarth, and Josef Zechner | 2021 | June 2021 |
| “Relative Performance Evaluation in CEO Compensation: A Talent-Retention Explanation” | David De Angelis and Yaniv Grinstein | 2020 | November 2020 |
| “Are Buybacks Good for Long-Term Shareholder Value? Evidence from Buybacks around the World” | Alberto Manconi, Urs Peyer, and Theo Vermaelen | 2019 | October 2019 |
| “Taxes, Capital Structure Choices, and Equity Value” | Mara Faccio and Jin Xu | 2018 | June 2018 |
| “Text-Based Industry Momentum” | Gerard Hoberg and Gordon M. Phillips | 2018 | December 2018 |
| “Industrial Electricity Usage and Stock Returns” | Zhi Da, Dayong Huang, Hayong Yun | 2017 | February 2017 |
| “Differential Access to Price Information in Financial Markets” | David Easley, Maureen O'Hara, Liyan Yang | 2016 | August 2016 |
| “Taxes and Capital Structure” | Mara Faccio, Jin Xu | 2015 | June 2015 |
| “How Does the Market Value Toxic Assets?” | Francis A. Longstaff, Brett W. Myers | 2014 | April 2014 |
| "Where Have All the IPOs Gone?" | Xiaohui Gao, Jay R. Ritter, Zhongyan Zhu | 2013 | December 2013 |
| "Aggregate Idiosyncratic Volatility" | Geert Bekaert, Robert J. Hodrick, Xiaoyan Zhang | 2012 | December 2012 |
| "Shareholders' Say on Pay: Does It Create Value?" | Jie Cai, Ralph A. Walkling | 2011 | April 2011 |
| "Can Mutual Fund Managers Pick Stocks? Evidence from Their Trades Prior to Earnings Announcements" | Malcolm Baker, Lubomir Litov, Jessica A. Wachter, Jeffrey Wurgler | 2010 | October 2010 |
| "Testing Theories of Capital Structure and Estimating the Speed of Adjustment" | Rongbing Huang, Jay R. Ritter | 2009 | April 2009 |
| "The Cost to Firms of Cooking Books" | Jonathan Karpoff, D. Scott Lee, Gerald S. Martin | 2008 | September 2008 |
| "Characterizing World Market Integration through Time" | Francesca Carrieri, Vihang Errunza, Ked Hogan | 2007 | December 2007 |
| "Top Management Incentives and the Pricing of Corporate Public Debt" | Hernan Ortiz-Molina | 2006 | June 2006 |
| "Determinants of Board Size and Composition: A Theory of Corporate Boards" | Charu G. Raheja | 2005 | June 2005 |
| "Abnormal Returns from the Common Stock Investments of the U.S. Senate" | Alan J. Ziobrowski, Ping Cheng, James W. Boyd, Brigitte J. Ziobrowski | 2004 | December 2004 |
| "Corporate Governance and the Home Bias" | Magnus Dahlquist, Lee Pinkowitz, René M. Stulz, Rohan Williamson | 2003 | March 2003 |
| "The Determinants of the Flow of Funds of Managed Portfolios: Mutual Funds vs. Pension Funds" | Diane Del Guercio, Paula A. Tkac | 2002 | December 2002 |
| "Long-Run Performance and Insider Trading in Completed and Canceled Seasoned Equity Offerings" | Jonathan Clarke, Craig Dunbar, Kathleen M. Kahle | 2001 | December 2001 |
| "The Long-Run Performance of Global Equity Offerings" | Stephen R. Foerster, G. Andrew Karolyi | 2000 (split) | December 2000 |
| "Behavioral Portfolio Theory" | Hersh Shefrin, Meir Statman | 2000 (split) | June 2000 |
| "A Trading Volume Benchmark: Theory and Evidence" | Paula A. Tkac | 1999 | March 1999 |

== See also ==
- List of economics awards
