= Leslie Young =

Leslie Young may refer to:

- Leslie Young (politician), Canadian politician
- Leslie Young (economist), New Zealand–Chinese economist
- Leslie Galen Young, American basketball player
- Leslie Ronald Young, British singer and broadcaster known as Jimmy Young
