= Larry Hsien Ping Lang =

Chinese economist, commentator, author and TV host

- 郎咸平
- Born: June 21, 1956 (age 69); Taoyuan County (now Taoyuan City), Taiwan
- Education: Tunghai University (BA); National Taiwan University (MA); University of Pennsylvania (MBA, PhD)
- Occupations: Emeritus Professor, CUHK Business School
- Years active: 1970–present

Larry Hsien Ping Lang (Chinese: 郎咸平; pinyin: Láng Xiánpíng; Wade–Giles: Lang Hsien-p'ing) (a.k.a. Larry Lang, Larry H.P. Lang, Lang Xianping, and Lang Hsien-ping) (born 1956) is a Taiwanese economist, commentator, author and TV host in China.

Lang has become a famous and controversial figure in China in recent years:

Since 2002, Lang has risen to his fame by "scolding". From D'Long to Haier, from TCL to Greencool, those scolded by him were all well-known large enterprises. People who hate him call him a "Rogue Professor", whereas those who like him say he dares to speak the truth.

== Personal background ==
Lang was born in 1956 in Taoyuan County, Taiwan (now Taoyuan City), and his ancestors are from Weifang, Shandong.

== Education ==
Lang received his bachelor's degree from Tunghai University in 1978, and his master's degree from National Taiwan University in 1980. He then studied at Wharton School of the University of Pennsylvania, where he received a master's degree and a PhD in Finance.

Lang was a lecturer at Wharton School of the University of Pennsylvania, Michigan State University, Ohio State University, New York University Stern School of Business and The University of Chicago. Lang was also Chair Professor of Finance, the Faculty of Business Administration, at The Chinese University of Hong Kong.

== Career and professional ethics ==
1994: Professor at The Chinese University of Hong Kong.

1996–2000: Consultant on Corporate governance Projects for World Bank, Washington, D.C.

1998–2001: Shenzhen Stock Exchange, and the Financial Services Bureau of the Hong Kong Government. He researched corporate governance and protection of the interests of small shareholders.

2004: Joint-appointed professor of The Chinese University of Hong Kong and the Cheung Kong Graduate School of Business in mainland China.

August 2004: Host of a finance talk show Cáijīng Láng Xiánpáng (财经郎闲评, literally "Finance Lang Leisure Talk") on Shanghai Television

Early 2006: Cáijīng Láng Xiánpáng suspended due to Lang's intention to uncover the Shanghai pension scandal on the show.

June 2009: Lang made a comeback to host Larry's Eyes on Finance (Chinese: 财经郎眼; pinyin: Cáijīng Láng Yǎn), a news commentary talk show.

== Notable works ==
=== Selected books for general audiences ===
- East Asian Corporation: Heroes or Villains? (with S. Claessens and S. Djankov, 2000)
- Corporate Governance (Chinese: 公司治理; pinyin: Gōngsī Zhìlǐ, 2004)
- Governance and Expropriation (editor, 2005)
- Manipulation (simplified Chinese: 操纵; traditional Chinese: 操縱; pinyin: Cāozòng, 2006)
- Operation (simplified Chinese: 运作; traditional Chinese: 運作; pinyin: Yùnzuò, 2006)
- Lang, Larry (2007). 本质 I——破解时尚产业战略突围之道 [Nature I: Breakthrough crack fashion industry strategy of the Road] (in Chinese) (1st ed.). Oriental Press Pub. ISBN 9787506027762.
- Lang, Larry (2007). 本质 II——破解娱乐传媒产业以小搏大之谜 [Nature II: crack the entertainment and media industry's big mystery] (in Chinese) (1st ed.). Oriental Press Pub. ISBN 9787506027779.
- Lang, Larry (2006). 中国式 MBO：布满鲜花的陷阱 [Chinese MBO: A Trap Filled with Flowers] (in Chinese) (1st ed.). Oriental Press Pub. ISBN 9787506023764.
- Larry Hsien Ping Lang Says: Why We Live So Hard? (simplified Chinese: 郎咸平说：我们的日子为什么这么难; traditional Chinese: 我們的日子為什麼這麼難, 2010)

(TODO: Some more titles of Lang's works may need to be translated from Chinese.)

=== Selected journal articles ===
- "Dividends and Expropriation" (with Mara Faccio and Leslie Young, American Economic Review, 2001)
- "When Does Corporate Diversification Matter to Productivity and Performance? Evidence from East Asia" (with S. Claessens and J. Fan, Pacific-Basin Finance Journal, Special Issue on Corporate Governance, July 2003)
- "Disentangling the Incentive and entrenchment Effects of Large Shareholdings" (with S. Claessens, S. Djankov and J. Fan, Journal of Finance, December 2003)
