= TipRanks =

Israeli financial technology company

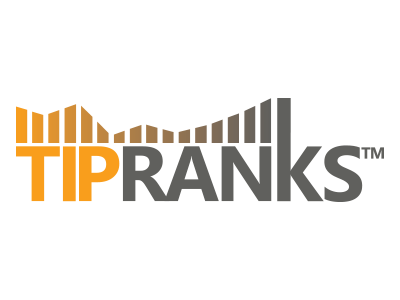
- Founded: 2012
- Founder: Uri Gruenbaum; Gilad Gat
- Headquarters: Tel Aviv, Israel
- Services: Fintech
- Website: www.tipranks.com

TipRanks is a financial technology company that uses artificial intelligence to analyze financial big data to provide stock market research tools for retail investors. The TipRanks Financial Accountability Engine scans and analyzes financial websites, corporate filings submitted to the SEC, and analyst ratings, to rank financial experts in real time.

The company operates a website and mobile app platform that offer free and paid subscriptions for stock market research. The platform supplies alternative financial data to retail investors. This data includes aggregated analyst ratings, financial blogger opinions, risk factors, insider trading, and a stock score called the Smart Score.

TipRanks provides data about the U.S., Canadian, UK, Australian, and German markets.

Additionally, TipRanks tracks and ranks financial experts, including sell-side financial analysts, financial bloggers, corporate insiders, hedge fund managers, and individual investors, and makes this information publicly available.

TipRanks' data is also available through banks and brokers. E-Trade, TD Ameritrade, eToro, Santander Bank, Interactive Brokers, CIBC, Questrade, TD Direct, Futu and Nasdaq.com, and other finance companies integrate TipRanks tools onto their platforms.

The company's headquarters is located in Tel Aviv.

== History ==
TipRanks was founded in June 2012 by Uri Gruenbaum and Gilad Gat. They teamed up with Roni Michaely, a finance professor at Cornell University, to create the company. TipRanks was initially available only as a browser extension in a freemium model. In 2013, the company launched its first service - the Financial Accountability Engine - to ensure transparency of online investment recommendations. In the same year, TipRanks won two Finovate awards for disruptive innovation in the financial research field.

In 2014, former New York governor Eliot Spitzer invested in the company and joined its board of directors. That same year, TipRanks launched a website offering rankings of analysts, bloggers and insiders. Israel’s biggest bank, Bank Hapoalim, launched a new service designed to help customers who trade in the United States make rational investment decisions, using TipRanks technology.

Later that year TipRanks CEO Uri Gruenbaum appeared with Spitzer on CNBC. They demonstrated TipRanks' abilities by ranking the best and worst analysts of the year, according to TipRanks.

In 2015, TipRanks took top prize at the IBM Watson Hackathon in Israel.

In 2016, TipRanks was selected as an Emerging Star by KPMG and H2 Ventures in their Fintech 100 Leading Global Fintech Innovators list.

In 2018, TipRanks announced that it was expanding its coverage to the Canadian markets.

In 2020, TipRanks expanded its coverage to the UK markets.

That same year, The Telegraph used data from TipRanks in its investment reporting for the first time.

In 2021, TipRanks launched a new tool that presents the risk factors of publicly traded companies. That same year, the company announced the launch of a new tool that presents an analysis of website traffic of publicly traded companies.

Also in 2020, Bloomberg used TipRanks data about corporate insider trading in an article about how the stock market is rigged.

In April of 2021, the company announced that it has raised a $77 million venture capital funding round.

In 2022, TipRanks launched country-specific websites for the UK, Canada, and Australia.

== Top Analysts of the Year ==
Every year, TipRanks announces the best performing analysts of the year in the US, Canada, and UK.

- US 2021
- Canada 2021
- UK 2020

== Awards ==
- 2013 Finovate spring contest for its Financial Accountability Engine
- 2013 Finovate fall contest for its Financial Accountability Engine’s coverage of financial blogger recommendations
- 2015 Winner of IBM Watson Hackathon
- 2016 Leading Global Fintech Innovators according to Fintech 100, H2 Ventures KPMG
