= Jay Ritter =

Financial economist

Jay R. Ritter
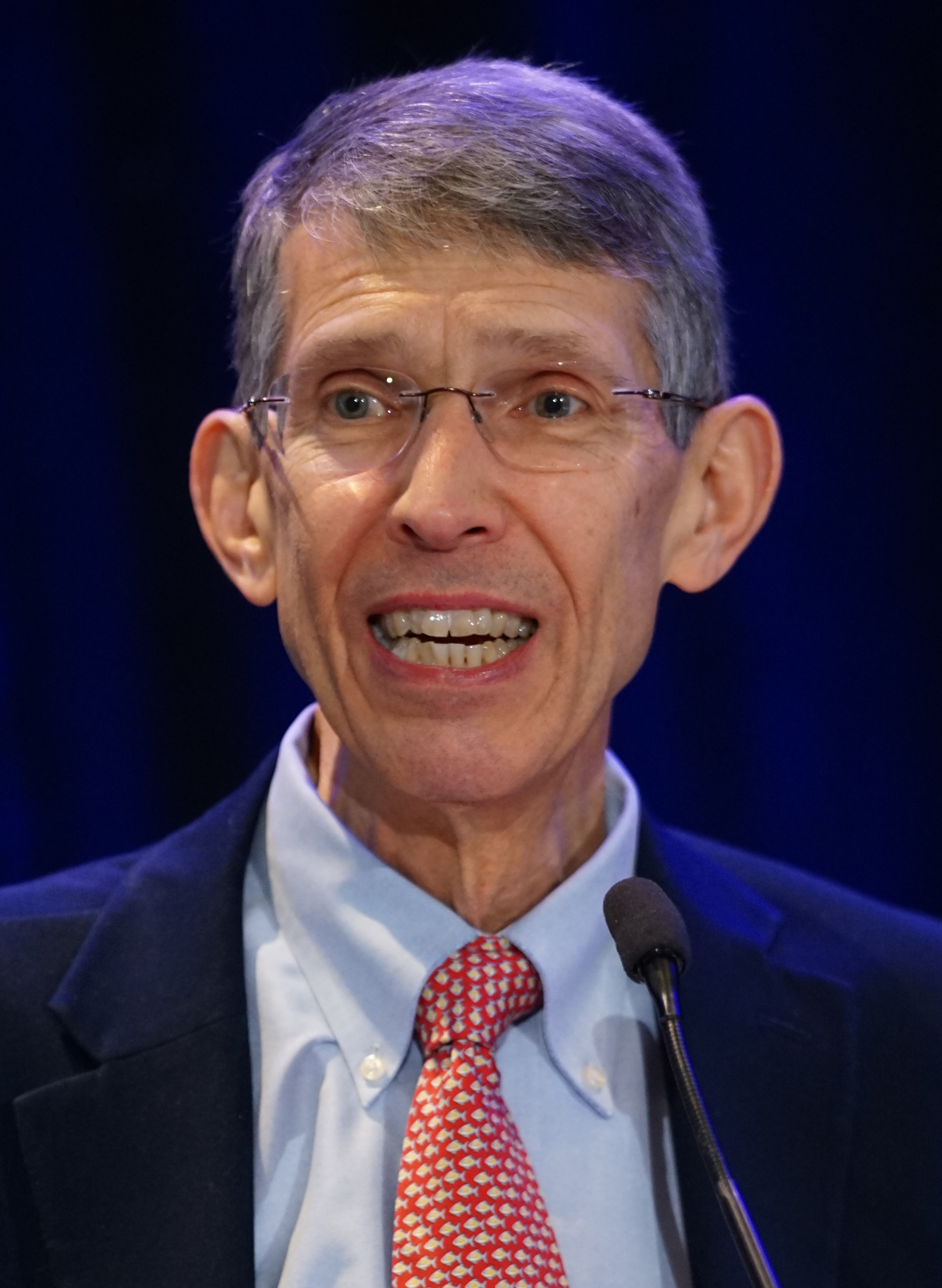
- Born: 1954 (age 71–72)

Academic background
- Education: University of Chicago (BA, MA, PhD)

Academic work
- Discipline: Financial economics
- Institutions: University of Florida
- Notable ideas: Initial public offering (IPO) underpricing, Long-run underperformance
- Awards: American Finance Association Fellow (2026); Smith Breeden Prize (1991); Jensen Prize (2010); William Sharpe Award (2009, 2013)

Jay R. Ritter (born 1954) is an American economist and the Joseph B. Cordell Eminent Scholar Chair Emeritus at the University of Florida's Warrington College of Business. Known widely as "Mr. IPO," Ritter is a leading authority on initial public offerings (IPOs), capital structure, and behavioral finance.

== Education ==
Ritter graduated from the University of Chicago, receiving his B.A. and M.A. in 1976 and his PhD in Economics and Finance in 1981.

== Academic career ==
Before joining the University of Florida in 1996, Ritter taught at the Wharton School of the University of Pennsylvania, the University of Michigan, and the University of Illinois Urbana-Champaign. He transitioned to professor emeritus status in 2024.

He served as president of the American Finance Association in 2014 and president of the Financial Management Association (FMA) from 2014 to 2015.

== Research and awards ==
Ritter's research focuses on the short-run underpricing and long-run underperformance of IPOs. His 1991 study, "The Long-Run Performance of Initial Public Offerings," has been cited over 60,000 times.

He has received several major awards and recognitions:

- AFA Fellow (2026): Elected as a Fellow of the American Finance Association.
- Smith Breeden Prize (1991): Awarded for the best paper in the Journal of Finance.
- Jensen Prize (2010): Awarded for "The marketing of seasoned equity offerings" (with Xiaohui Gao).
- William Sharpe Award (2009, 2013): Two-time recipient for best paper in the Journal of Financial and Quantitative Analysis.
