= Bharat Anand =

American economist

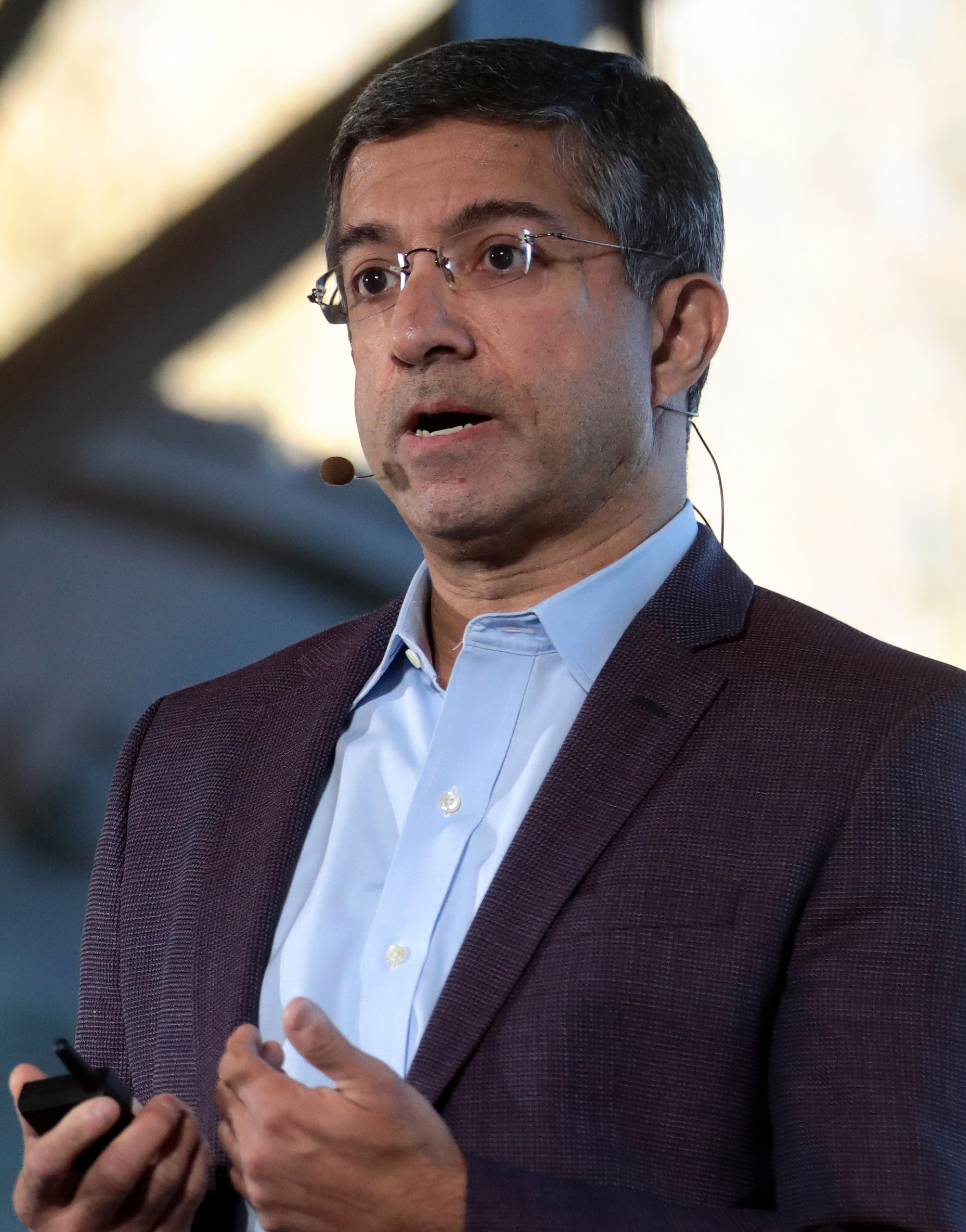
- Anand in 2019

11th Dean of New York University Stern School of Business
- Incumbent
- Assumed office August 2025
- Preceded by: Raghu Sundaram

Vice Provost of Harvard University
- In office October 2018 – August 2025

Personal details
- Born: Bharat N. Anand
- Education: Harvard University (BA); Princeton University (PhD)

Bharat N. Anand is an American economist and the Dean of the New York University Stern School of Business. He formerly served as the Henry R. Byers Professor of Business administration in the Strategy Unit at Harvard Business School and the faculty chair of the HBX initiative. He also served on the university's HarvardX Faculty Committee.

Anand's research is in applied and empirical industrial organization, and examines competition in information goods markets, with a primary focus on media and entertainment. He is also an expert in multi-business strategy. He chairs several executive education programs, including the school's executive education program on media strategies. He received an AB in Economics, magna cum laude, from Harvard University, and his PhD in economics from Princeton University, where he was nominated to the Princeton Junior Society of Fellows.

His work examines the contemporary issues of mass information and related media strategies.

== Publications ==
He is the author of The Content Trap, which contains lessons for businesses, entrepreneurs, and individuals trying to figure out what to do next.

He has authored numerous case studies in business and corporate strategy, including those on Capital One, Danaher Corporation, The Economist, International Management Group, News Corporation, Random House, and Schibsted. For several years, Anand taught the popular second-year elective course in Corporate Strategy, for which he received the Faculty Award for Teaching Excellence from the MBA class of 2006 and the MBA class of 2007. He has served as course head of the first-year Strategy course at HBS, and he currently teaches Strategy in the General Management Program
