= Peter Blair Henry =

American economist

Peter Henry
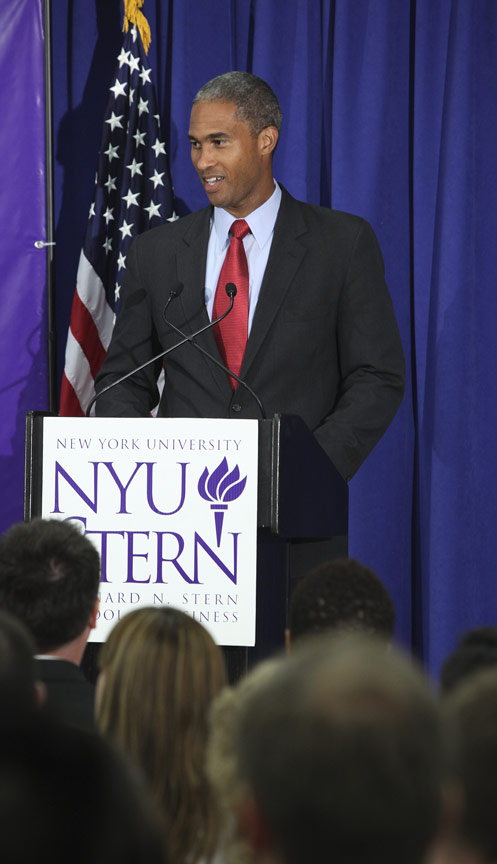

Dean of the New York University Stern School of Business
- In office January 2010 – December 2017
- Preceded by: Thomas F. Cooley
- Succeeded by: Raghu Sundaram

Personal details
- Born: July 30, 1969 (age 57) Kingston, Jamaica
- Education: University of North Carolina, Chapel Hill (BA); St Catherine's College, Oxford (BA); Massachusetts Institute of Technology (PhD)
- Website: Official website

Peter Blair Henry, an economist, was the ninth Dean of New York University's Leonard N. Stern School of Business, and William R. Berkley Professor of Economics and Business, and author of TURNAROUND: Third World Lessons for First World Growth (Basic Books, March 2013). Previously, he was the Konosuke Matsushita Professor of International Economics at Stanford University.

== Background and education ==
Born in Kingston, Jamaica in 1969, Peter Blair Henry became a US citizen in 1986.

Henry was a Rhodes Scholar at St Catherine's College, Oxford where he received a BA in mathematics in 1993 and a Full Blue in basketball. He also received a BA in economics with distinction and highest honors in 1991 from The University of North Carolina at Chapel Hill where he was a Morehead-Cain Scholar, a National Merit Scholar, a member of Phi Beta Kappa, a Marshall Scholar-Elect, a reserve wide receiver on the varsity football team, and a finalist in the 1991 campus-wide slam-dunk competition.

Henry received his PhD in economics from the Massachusetts Institute of Technology (MIT) in 1997. While in graduate school, he served as a consultant to the Governors of the Bank of Jamaica and the Eastern Caribbean Central Bank (ECCB). His research at the ECCB contributed to the intellectual foundation for establishing the first securities exchange in the Eastern Caribbean Currency Area.

== Career ==
=== Academic ===
Peter Blair Henry is Dean Emeritus of New York University's Leonard N. Stern School of Business. The youngest person to hold the position, he assumed the Deanship in January 2010 and joined the NYU Stern Faculty as the William R. Berkley Professor of Economics and Finance.

Henry joined NYU Stern from Stanford University, where he was the Konosuke Matsushita Professor of International Economics, the John and Cynthia Fry Gunn Faculty Scholar, and associate director of the Center for Global Business and the Economy at the Stanford University Graduate School of Business.

Henry's research and teaching have received support from the National Science Foundation's Early CAREER Development Program (2001–2006). From 2000 to 2001, Henry was a National Fellow at the Hoover Institution.

Henry also serves as a member of the board of directors at the National Bureau of Economic Research (NBER), the nation's leading nonprofit, non-partisan economic research organization; as a member of the Council on Foreign Relations; as a Nonresident Senior Fellow of the Brookings Institution; as a member of the Federal Reserve Bank of New York's Economic Advisory Panel; and as a member of the board of directors for Citigroup as well as General Electric and Nike, Inc. In 2015, Henry was awarded the Foreign Policy Association Medal, the highest honor bestowed by the organization.

In 2018, the Council for Economic Education honored Henry with its Visionary Award.

=== Government ===
An expert on the global economy, Henry led the external economics advisory group for then-Senator Barack Obama's presidential campaign in 2008. Following the historic victory on November 4, Henry was chosen to lead the Presidential Transition Team's review of international lending agencies such as the International Monetary Fund (IMF) and the World Bank. In June 2009, President Obama appointed him to the President's Commission on White House Fellowships.

=== Books, publications and media ===
Henry's first book, TURNAROUND: Third World Lessons for First World Growth (Basic Books, March 2013), directly addresses issues of economic efficiency as well as matters of international relations. In it, Henry argues that the secret to emerging countries' success (and to the future prosperity of the developed world as well) is discipline—a sustained commitment to a pragmatic growth strategy. In many ways, TURNAROUND is an extension of Henry's very first lesson in international economics, which he received at the age of eight as his family moved from the Caribbean island of Jamaica to affluent Wilmette, Illinois. The elusive answer to the question of why the average standard of living can be so different from one country to another still drives him today.

The author of numerous articles and book chapters, Henry is best known for a series of publications in the three flagship journals of the American Economic Association that overturn conventional wisdom on the topics of debt relief, international capital flows, and the role of institutions in economic growth: "Debt Relief" Journal of Economic Perspectives (Winter 2006); "Capital Account Liberalization: Theory, Evidence, and Speculation" Journal of Economic Literature (December 2007); "Institutions vs. Policies: A Tale of Two Islands" American Economic Review (May 2009). Henry's writing also appears in Global Crises, Global Solutions, the published proceedings of the Copenhagen Consensus, an international conference on how to make the most efficient use of the world's scarcest resources. The Economist magazine named the conference publication one of the Best Business Books of 2004.

Henry is also known to have spoken on William Arthur Lewis and his dual-sector model in his 2014 speech “Capital and Labor in the 21st Century: A Cautionary Tale” by discussing the importance of developing nations to create enough jobs to keep up with their growing working-age populations and similarly advocating for modern capitalist economies and incorporating his own insights on liberalized capital accounts open to foreign capital.

More recently, Henry's work with Camille Gardner in “The Global Infrastructure Gap: Potential, Perils, and a Framework for Distinction” Journal of Economic Literature (December 2023) tackled global infrastructure and the importance of foreign investment to the infrastructure and overall productivity and employment of developing countries. They also found that this not only would greatly benefit developing countries and their ability to absorb and support growing working-age populations, but also have great potential for developed countries to see significant private and social capital returns on investments.

Henry is regularly cited in the media including on CNBC, Financial Times, Foreign Policy, and others.

== Personal life ==
He lives with his wife and their four sons in New York City. He is also the cousin of Orange is the New Black star Samira Wiley.
