= Whittaker–Henderson smoothing =

Smoothing of data points, digital filter

Whittaker–Henderson smoothing or Whittaker–Henderson graduation is a digital filter that can be applied to a set of digital data points for the purpose of smoothing the data, that is, to increase the precision of the data without distorting the signal tendency.

It was first introduced by Georg Bohlmann (for order 1). E.T. Whittaker independently proposed the same idea in 1923 (for order 3). Robert Henderson contributed to the topic by his two publications in 1924 and 1925. Whittaker–Henderson smoothing can be seen as P-Splines of degree 0. The special case of order 2 also goes under the name Hodrick–Prescott filter.

== Mathematical formulation ==
For a signal $y_i$, $i=1, \ldots, n$, of equidistant steps, e.g. a time series with constant intervals, the Whittaker–Henderson smoothing of order $p$ is the solution to the following penalized least squares problem:

$$\hat{x} = \operatorname{argmin}_{x_1, \ldots, x_n} \sum_{i=1}^n (y_i - x_i)^2 + \lambda \sum_{i=1}^{n-p} (\Delta^p x_i)^2 \,,$$

with penalty parameter $\lambda$ and difference operator $\Delta$:

$$\begin{align}
\Delta x_i &= x_{i+1} - x_i \\
\Delta^2 x_i &= \Delta(\Delta x_i) = x_{i+2} - 2 x_{i+1} + x_i
\end{align}$$

and so on.

For $\lambda \rightarrow \infty$, the solution converges to a polynomial of degree $p-1$. For $\lambda \rightarrow 0$, the solution converges to the observations $y$.

The Whittaker-Henderson method is very similar to modern Smoothing spline methods; the latter use derivatives rather than differences of the smoothed values in the penalty term.

== Properties ==
- Reversing $y$ just reverses the solution $\hat{x}$.
- The first $p$ moments of the data are preserved, i.e., the j-th momentum $\sum_i y_i^j = \sum_i \hat{x}_i^j$ for $j=0\ldots p$.
- Polynomials of degree $p-1$ are unaffected by the smoothing.

== Binomial data ==
Henderson formulates the smoothing problem for binomial data, using the logarithm of binomial probabilities in place of the error sum-of-squares,

$$\log Q = \sum_x \left\{ \theta_x \log q_x + (E_x-\theta_x) \log ( 1-q_x ) \right\}$$

where $E_x$ is the number of binary observations made at $x$; $q_x$ is the probability that the event of interest is realized, and $\theta_x$ is the number of instances in which the event is realized.

Henderson applies the logistic transformation to the probabilities $q_x$ for the penalty term,

$$\lambda_x = \log \frac{q_x}{1-q_x}; \mbox{ and }  y=\sum_x \left ( \Delta^3 \lambda_x \right )^2.$$

Then, Henderson places an a priori probability on a set of graduated values,

$$\log P = f(y)$$

for a decreasing function $f(y)$ ($f(y) = -y$ for the usual quadratic penalty). Henderson's penalized criterion is

$$\log P + \log Q,$$

which is a modification of the Whittaker-Henderson smoothing criterion for binomial data.
