= Raghu Sundaram =

American economist

Dean of the New York University Stern School of Business
- In office January 2018 – July 2024
- Preceded by: Peter Blair Henry
- Succeeded by: Bharat Anand

Personal details
- Born: 1961 (age 63–64); Madras, India
- Children: Aditi Sundaram
- Education: University of Madras (BA); Indian Institute of Management Ahmedabad (MBA); Cornell University (MA, PhD)

Rangarajan K. "Raghu" Sundaram is an Indian-born American academic. He formerly served as Dean of the New York University Stern School of Business, and is the author or co-author of two books.

== Early life ==
Sundaram was educated in India, where he earned a Bachelor's degree from the University of Madras in 1982 and a master in business administration from the Indian Institute of Management Ahmedabad in 1984. He earned a master's degree and a PhD in Economics from Cornell University in 1987 and 1988 respectively.

== Career ==
Sundaram taught economics at the University of Rochester from 1988 to 1996, when he joined the New York University Stern School of Business. He has served as its dean since January 2018. Since 2020, he serves as an academic council member of Krea University, a liberal arts and sciences private university located in Sricity, Andhra Pradesh, India.

Sundaram is the author or co-author of two books, including one about derivatives. He won the Jensen Prize from the Journal of Financial Economics in 2000.

== Works ==
- Sundaram, Rangarajan K. (1996). A First Course in Optimization Theory. Cambridge, U.K.: Cambridge University Press. ISBN 9780521497701.
- Sundaram, Rangarajan K.; Das, Sanjiv R. (2010). Derivatives: Principles and Practice. New York: McGraw Hill. ISBN 9780072949315. OCLC 741054756.

== See also ==
- Indians in the New York City metropolitan area
- New York University
