= James D. Hamilton =

American econometrician (born 1954)

- Born: November 29, 1954 (age 71)
- Citizenship: American

Academic background
- Education: University of California, Berkeley

Academic work
- Discipline: Econometrics
- Institutions: University of California, San Diego
- Awards: Research Associate with the National Bureau of Economic Research; Best Paper Award for 2010-2011 from the International Institute of Forecasters; 2014 award for Outstanding Contributions to the Profession from the International Association for Energy Economics
- Website: Information at IDEAS / RePEc

James Douglas Hamilton (born November 29, 1954) is an American econometrician currently teaching at University of California, San Diego. His work is especially influential in time series and energy economics. He received his PhD from the University of California, Berkeley in 1983.

His research spans a range of topics, including monetary policy, business cycles, energy markets, econometrics. His work has been translated into Japanese, Chinese, and Italian.

== Published works ==
- Time Series Analysis (Princeton University Press, 1994)
- Advances in Markov-Switching Models (Physica-Verlag, 2002; Coedited with Baldev Raj)
- Risk Premia in Crude Oil Prices (Journal of International Money and Finance, 2014; Coedited with Jing Cynthia Wu)
- The Equilibrium Real Funds Rate: Past, Present and Future (IMF Economic Review, 2016); Coedited with Ethan Harris, Jan Hatzius and Kenneth West.
