= Mara Faccio =

Economist

Mara Faccio is an economist and currently the Duke Realty Chair in Finance and Professor of Finance at the Krannert School of Management at Purdue University.

She is a research associate at the NBER. She is an associate editor of the Journal of Financial and Quantitative Analysis and the Journal of Corporate Finance. and previously held editorial positions at Financial Management magazine and The Review of Financial Studies.

She won the 2015 William F. Sharpe Award for Scholarship in Financial Research for her paper “Taxes and Capital Structure” in the Journal of Financial and Quantitative Analysis. In 2016, she won the referee of the year award from the Review of Corporate Finance Studies.

Faccio started her career in 1999, as an assistant professor of finance at the Università Cattolica del Sacro Cuore in Milan. She then moved to the Mendoza College of Business at the University of Notre Dame in 2001, and after that the Owen Graduate School of Management at Vanderbilt University in 2003. In 2007, she became a full professor at Purdue University.

Faccio earned a Laurea in Economics (in 1994) and Master in Accounting and Finance (in 1995) from the University of Pavia, a MPhil in Accounting and Finance from the City University Business School in London in 1997, and a Dottorato in Finance from the Università Cattolica in Milan in 1999.

== Research ==
Her research mainly focuses on corporate finance, banking, taxation and the political economy of corporate finance. Her works has been quoted over 18000 times according to Google Scholar. She has published in The American Economic Review, the Journal of Financial Economics and The Journal of Finance.

Her research has been cited in The Washington Post, The Atlantic, Forbes and The New York Times.

=== Selected bibliography ===
- Faccio, Mara (2006). "Politically Connected Firms". The American Economic Review. 96 (1): 369–386.
- Faccio, Mara; Lang, Larry H. P (2002-09-01). "The ultimate ownership of Western European corporations". Journal of Financial Economics. 65 (3): 365–395.
- Faccio, Mara; Masulis, Ronald W.; McConnell, John J. (2006). "Political Connections and Corporate Bailouts". The Journal of Finance. 61 (6): 2597–2635.
- Faccio, Mara; Lang, Larry H. P; Young, Leslie (2001). "Dividends and Expropriation". The American Economic Review. 91 (1): 54–78.
