= Robert J. Hodrick =

American economist

- Born: September 12, 1950 (age 76)

Academic background
- Education: University of Chicago; Princeton University
- Doctoral advisor: Arnold Zellner

Academic work
- Discipline: Monetary economics
- Institutions: Columbia University
- Notable ideas: Hodrick–Prescott filter
- Website: Information at IDEAS / RePEc

Robert James Hodrick (born September 12, 1950), is a U.S. economist specialized in International Finance. AB, Princeton, 1972; PhD, University of Chicago, 1976. Until 1983, he served as a professor at Carnegie-Mellon University, where he worked jointly with Edward C. Prescott on business cycle, and developed the Hodrick–Prescott filter to distinguish trends from cyclical fluctuations. He taught at Northwestern University and joined Columbia University in 1996.
