= Roni Michaely =

- Education: New York University (Ph.D.)
- Occupation: Economist

Roni Michaely is an Israeli academic specializing in Economics and Finance. Michaely is Professor of Finance at the University of Hong Kong, School of Business and Economics. He was also appointed to a director of the Israel Securities Authority (ISA) in January 1998 and also serves as an associate editor for the Review of Financial Studies.

Michaely's research interests are in the area of corporate finance, capital markets and valuation. This included research focuses on conflict of interest in the capital markets, corporation payout policy, and the pricing and optimal trading mechanisms of IPOs.

== Early life and education ==
Michaely was born in Israel and studied Economics at the Tel Aviv University. He obtained his PhD from New York University in 1990.

== Career ==
In 1990, Michaely was appointed Rudd Family Professor of Management and professor of finance at Cornell University's Johnson Graduate School of Management.

In 2018, he was Swiss Finance Institute professor of finance at Geneva Finance Research Institute at the University of Geneva.

In 2021, he was appointed Professor of Finance at the University of Hong Kong.

Michaely published numerous works (several of which received best-paper awards) in refereed journals such as the Review of Financial Studies, the Journal of Finance, the Journal of Business, and the Journal of Financial and Quantitative Analysis. His research has been also frequently featured in the Wall Street Journal, the New York Times, the Economist, Investor's Business Daily, the San Francisco Chronicle, BusinessWeek, Forbes, Barrons, Money, Reuters, Worth, among others.

In 2012, Michaely invested in TipRanks – a tech company that lends transparency into the financial markets by showing investors the track record and performance of anyone who gives financial advice. He is an active member of the board of directors.

== Recognition ==
A 1999-2000 Whitcomb Fellow who received the Johnson School Award for Exceptional Research for 2001–2002, Michaely's research has received several awards and honors. Awards include the 2000 Journal of Finance Smith Breeden Prize for distinguished paper, the 2000 Western Finance Association Award for the best paper on capital formation, the Review of Financial Studies 1999 Barclays Global Investors/Michael Brennan Runner-up Award, the 1999 Western Finance Association Award for the best paper, 1996 Quantitative Alliance Group Prize for best paper, and the 1996 Western Finance Association Award for best paper on investments.

== Selected publications ==
- Allen, F. and R. Michaely (forthcoming). Payout policy. North-Holland Handbooks of Economics. G. Constantinides, M. Harris and R. Stulz.
- Ellis, K., R. Michaely and M. O'Hara (2002). "The making of a dealer market: From entry to equilibrium in the trading of NASDAQ stocks." Journal of Finance 57(5): 2289–2316.
- Grullon, G., R. Michaely and B. Swaminathan (2002). "Are dividend changes a sign of firm maturity?" Journal of Business 75(3): 387–424.
- Grullon, G. and R. Michaely (2002). "Dividends, share repurchases, and the substitution hypothesis." Journal of Finance 57(4): 1649–1684.
- Llorente, G., R. Michaely, G. Saar and J. Wang (2002). "Dynamic volume-return relation of individual stocks." Review of Financial Studies 15(4): 1005–1047.
