= Journal of Banking and Finance =

- Discipline: Finance
- Language: English
- Edited by: Christa Bouwman

Publication details
- History: 1977–present
- Publisher: Elsevier
- Frequency: Monthly
- Impact factor: 2.269 (2019)

Standard abbreviations
- ISO 4: J. Bank. Finance

Indexing
- CODEN: JBFIDO
- ISSN: 0378-4266
- LCCN: 79646417
- OCLC no.: 03401093

Links
- Journal homepage; Online access

The Journal of Banking and Finance is a peer-reviewed academic journal covering research on financial institutions, capital markets, and topics in investments and corporate finance. In 1989, the journal absorbed Studies in Banking & Finance.

A 2011 study ranked it among six elite finance journals, partly based on citation counts. At that time, the journal had an unusually high number of citations of articles that were published in the JBF compared with other journals. More recently, one ranking listed the journal as the 20th finance journal, although some of the journals ranked above it on the basis of citations have an unusually large number of citations in other journals associated with one publisher.

The JBF publishes theoretical and empirical research papers spanning all the major research fields in finance and banking. Geert Bekaert was the managing editor from 2015 until February 2025, when Christa Bouwman became the managing editor.

== See also ==
- Journal of Money, Credit and Banking
