= Journal of Financial and Quantitative Analysis =

- Discipline: Financial Economics
- Language: English

Publication details
- History: 1966–present
- Publisher: Michael G. Foster School of Business (University of Washington)
- Frequency: 8/year
- Impact factor: 5.525 (2021)

Standard abbreviations
- ISO 4: J. Financ. Quant. Anal.

Indexing
- ISSN: 0022-1090 (print); 1756-6916 (web)
- JSTOR: jfinaquananal
- OCLC no.: 781598756

The Journal of Financial and Quantitative Analysis is a peer-reviewed academic journal published eight times a year by the Michael G. Foster School of Business at the University of Washington in cooperation with the W. P. Carey School of Business at Arizona State University, Boston College Carroll School of Management, HEC Paris, the University of British Columbia Sauder School of Business, and the University of Illinois at Urbana-Champaign Gies College of Business. It publishes theoretical and empirical research in financial economics. Topics include corporate finance, investments, capital markets, securities markets, and quantitative methods of particular relevance to financial researchers.

The Financial Times includes the JFQA, as it is widely known among finance professors, as one of the five finance journals in its Top 50 journals list.

Starting with articles published in 1999, it has awarded the William Sharpe Award for the best article published in the journal during the year.

Reflecting the growth of academic publishing in the field of finance, the JFQA has expanded the number of editors and the number of articles (and pages) published per year. For example, in 2002 the journal had 3 managing editors (Stephen Brown, Jonathan Karpoff, and Paul Malatesta) and published 4 issues with a total of 721 pages. In 2022, the JFQA published 8 issues with 3,313 pages, and had 7 managing editors (Hendrik Bessembinder, Ran Duchin, Thierry Foucault, Jarrad Harford, Kai Li, George Pennacchi, and Stephan Siegel).

== See also ==
- William Sharpe Award
