= Papa John =

Papa John may refer to:

- John Phillips (1935–2001), American musician most famous as a member of The Mamas & the Papas
- John Schnatter (born 1961), American businessman and founder of Papa John's Pizza
- Papa John's Pizza, American restaurant chain

== See also ==
- Papajohn, a Greek surname
