= KFC Yum! Center =

Multi-purpose indoor arena in Louisville, Kentucky, US

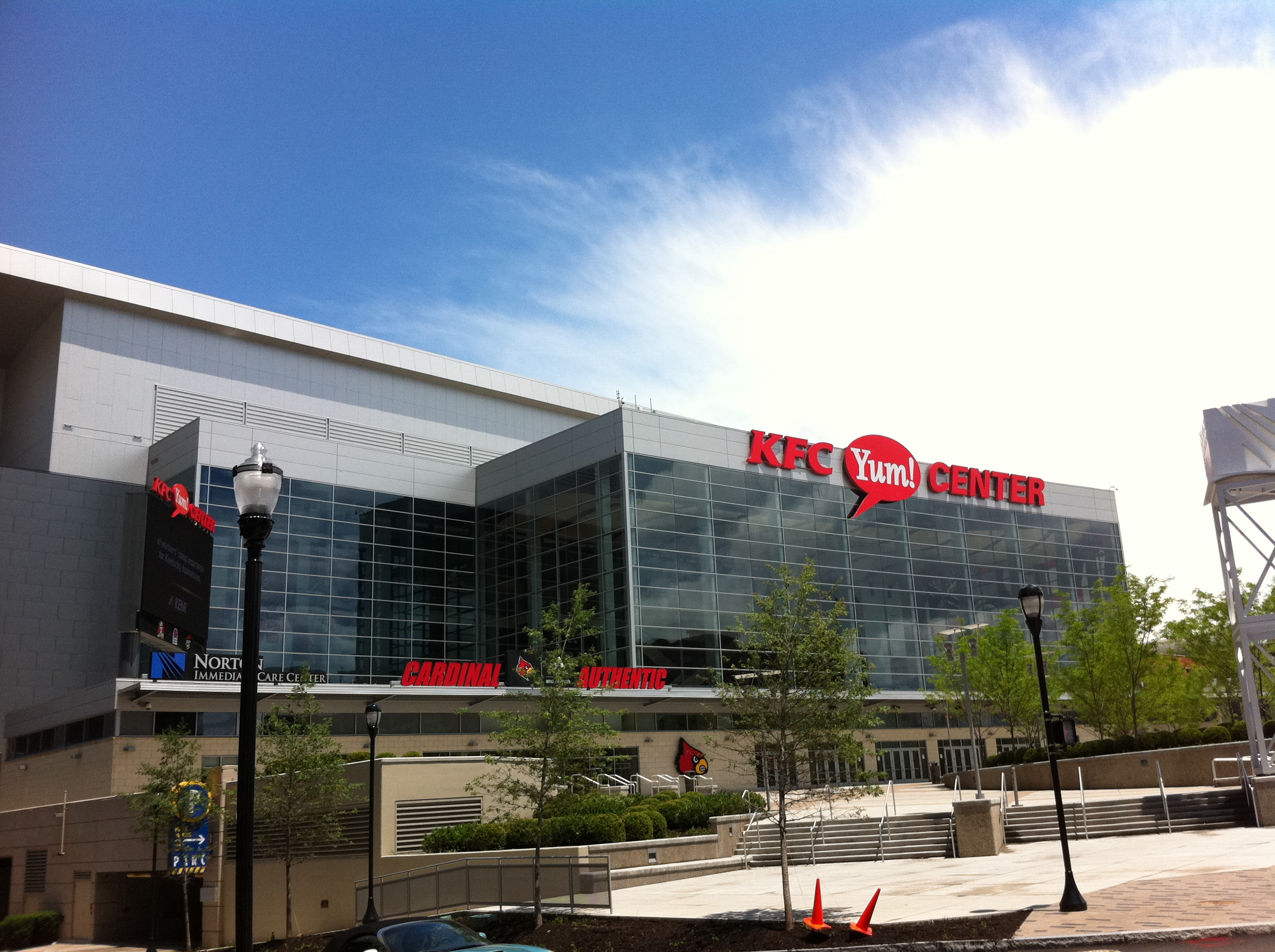
- KFC Yum! Center in 2011
- Interactive map of KFC Yum! Center
- Address: 1 Arena Plaza
- Location: Louisville, Kentucky, U.S.
- Coordinates: 38°15′27″N 85°45′14″W
- Owner: Louisville Arena Authority
- Operator: Legends Global
- Capacity: Basketball: 22,090; Volleyball: 21,500; End stage: 17,500; Max: 22,090
- Surface: Multi-Surface; Denny Crum Court

Construction
- Groundbreaking: November 28, 2006
- Opened: October 10, 2010
- Cost: $238 Million
- Architects: Populous (formerly HOK Sport); Louis and Henry Group; C.L. Anderson Architecture; Jill Lewis Smith Architects
- Project manager: PC Sports
- Structural engineer: Walter P Moore
- Services engineers: Smith Seckman Reid, Inc.
- General contractor: M. A. Mortenson Company

Tenants
- Louisville Cardinals (NCAA); Men's basketball (2010–present); Women's basketball (2010–present); Women's volleyball (2011–2017); Louisville Xtreme (IFL) (2021)

Website
- kfcyumcenter.com

The KFC Yum! Center is a multi-purpose indoor arena in Downtown Louisville, Kentucky. It is named after the KFC restaurant chain and Yum! Brands, the parent company of KFC. Adjacent to the Ohio River waterfront, it is located on Main Street between 2nd Street and 3rd Street, and opened on October 10, 2010. The arena is part of a $450 million project that includes a 975-car parking structure and floodwall.

The Louisville Cardinals men's and women's basketball teams from the University of Louisville are the primary tenants of the arena complex. The U of L women's volleyball team began using the arena as a part-time home in 2011, and made the arena its main home in 2012. With 22,090 seats for basketball, it is the largest arena in the United States by seating capacity designed primarily for basketball, (Note: Before the 2019–20 season, this distinction belonged to Rupp Arena in Lexington, Kentucky, home to the Cardinals' archrival, the Kentucky Wildcats. A renovation project during the 2019 offseason reduced that venue's capacity from 23,500 to 20,545. The largest arena in the U.S. ever to have been designed primarily for basketball is Thompson–Boling Arena at the University of Tennessee, which opened with a capacity of 24,000 but has since been downsized to 21,678. The largest NBA arena by basketball seating capacity is United Center in Chicago, with 20,917.) and the second-largest used for college basketball, behind the JMA Wireless Dome at Syracuse University, a venue built to house football and lacrosse in addition to basketball. The arena's current attendance record for a sporting event is 22,815, set March 9, 2013, against Notre Dame (men's basketball). The current attendance record for any event is 23,085, set March 9, 2019, when Metallica played their WorldWired Tour.

From April to May 2021, it was home to the Louisville Xtreme of the Indoor Football League, but they were voted out of the league after five games.

== History ==
Early arena planning focused on two potential arena sites: one owned by the Louisville Water Company bounded by Liberty Street, Muhammad Ali Blvd, 2nd and 3rd Streets, and one owned by Louisville Gas & Electric (LG&E) on the waterfront between 2nd and 3rd Streets on Main. In March 2006, University of Louisville men's basketball coach Rick Pitino stated he would not coach in an arena built at the water company site. This came at a time when the House budget committee earmarked funding for the arena only if it was built at the water company site. Others, including Papa John's Pizza founder John Schnatter, a major donor to the U of L athletic program, criticized the LG&E location due to its higher cost.

On March 3, 2006, Kentucky Governor Ernie Fletcher, flanked by Louisville mayor Jerry Abramson, announced at a rally in Frankfort his strong preference for locating the new arena at the LG&E site along the Louisville riverfront as it was "undoubtedly the best site for economic development" and would give the state a good return on its investment. Kentucky senate president David L. Williams pledged to remove the site preference from the budget proposal.

About two months later on April 23, 2006, the Louisville Arena Authority released the design for the interior. The number of seats increased from the original 19,000 to 22,000; it would be divided up between 11,348 seats in the lower bowl, with the remainder on the upper tier. The seat width also increased from 19 to 20 inches. Also included in the release was a proposed sports bar that would be located on the main concourse; it would be open year-round and have views of the Ohio River. The number of suites would increase to 72 that would be located on two levels between the main and upper concourses; they would be twice as large as those in Freedom Hall. A public plaza and concourse along Main Street was also revealed.

Prior to the release of the design, an arena report urged the facility to incorporate energy-saving elements into the construction. Other recommendations included the avoidance of large, blank walls, the inclusion of public art, and the provision of year-round uses inside the building.

On May 21, 2007, the Louisville Arena Authority voted unanimously to remove a hotel from the arena project. The 425-room hotel, which was envisioned as one way to pay off the project, was deleted because other revenues to cover the $252 million construction cost were projected to be higher than expected. The hotel would have also taken land away from a public plaza along Main Street. The Greater Louisville Hotel and Lodging Association also supported the measure, stating that downtown Louisville had enough projected rooms.

The hotel was expected to contribute $1.3 million in annual lease payments, but other sources of revenue were hoped to cover the $573 million in total debt over 30 years on a $339 million bond issue for the arena. Originally, the Kentucky Finance Cabinet projected $211 million in new tax revenues in 2005. A more recent and comprehensive survey was completed recently and the projected revenue increased to $265 million. The other sources of revenue to cover the deletion of the hotel include:

- $265 million from a tax-increment financing district
- The city's pledge of $206 million minimum
- $179 million from interior advertising
- $84 million facility fee
- $63 million in luxury suite revenues
- $37 million in building naming rights

The removal of the hotel would allow for a wider Main Street plaza and would allow for new features, such as a Washington Street entrance. It would also allow for more design flexibility and would lend itself to host after-hour concerts and other events on the plaza.

On April 19, 2010, it was announced that Louisville-based fast food chain Yum! Brands would pay $13.5 million for the naming rights and would sell the products of three of its chains—KFC, Pizza Hut and Taco Bell—in seven concession stands within the arena.

=== Recent developments ===
In 2025, the KFC Yum! Center marked its 15th anniversary with a series of community events and commemorations highlighting the arena's role in downtown Louisville's revitalization. Since its opening in 2010, the venue has hosted nearly 2,000 events and welcomed more than 13 million guests, generating an estimated $1.4 billion in economic impact for Louisville.

The Louisville Arena Authority (LLA) began a major roof replacement project in August 2025, covering approximately 250,000 square feet at a cost of about $13.6 million. The new roof is expected to be completed by December 2025. The arena remains operational during new renovations, with no interruptions to any prescheduled concerts or events. The Louisville Arena Authority also announced that more than $100 million renovation plans are expected to be implemented in the next 15 years to enhance the guest experience and make the venue top-notch for hosting sport and entertainment events.

== Features ==
The arena's features include an integrated scoring and video display system, which includes large LED video displays within the seating bowl, with the display and control system provided by Daktronics.

== Financing ==
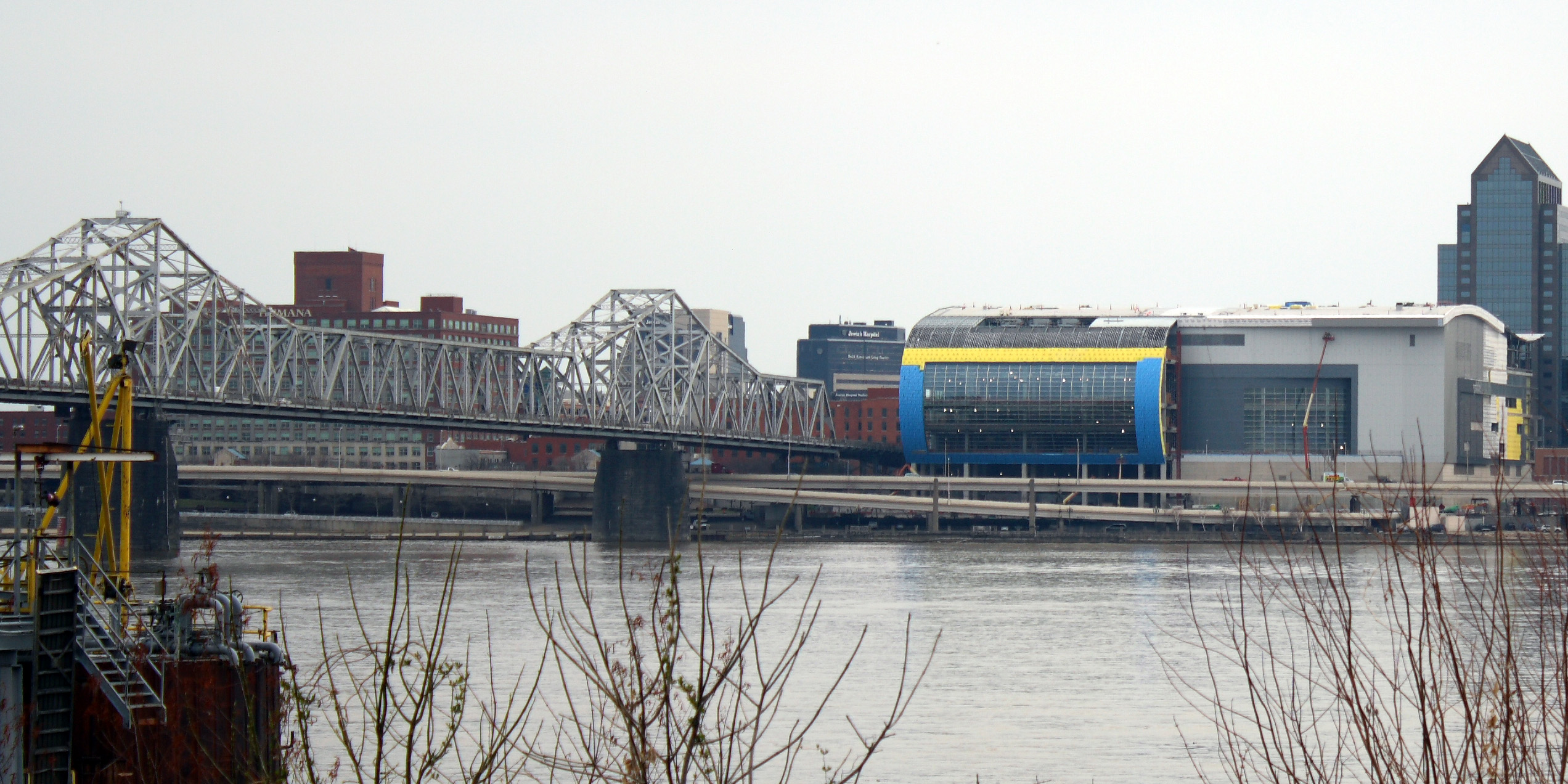
The arena seen from the Ohio River, with Clark Memorial Bridge to the left

As a result of the subtracted hotel and the revised projected revenues, the arena, which would have lost $123,000 a year originally, might turn a small profit. The arena would generate $9.2 million a year in rent, merchandise, concessions and other revenues, along with funds from a $2 ticket tax on every Louisville men's basketball game during the first 30 years of the arena's operation. The arena would spend just under $9 million a year, generating an annual profit of $196,000.

Another reason for the revised operating expenses is the reimbursement fee that the Louisville Arena Authority must pay to the Kentucky State Fair Board for the arena's impact on Freedom Hall. The decrease in revenues, from $1.3 million to $738,000 during the first 10 years of operations of the new arena, is the result of a revision taking into account fewer events for the center.

On May 28, 2007, it was announced that the Louisville Metro Council was to propose an arena-financing deal that would save city taxpayers $3.4 million/year, or $100 million over three decades. The proposal, required the arena officials to exhaust other revenue sources, such as naming rights and luxury suite sales, before asking the metro government to pay more than its minimum pledge. The minimum pledge was $206 million towards the construction of the arena in annual installments between 2010 and 2039. Under the deal, the Louisville Arena Authority can ask the local government for up to $3.5 million more a year to cover the debt only if at least five other sources are drained. If the Louisville Arena Authority would have to use additional city funds for two straight years, the Louisville Metro Council has the right to audit the arena's revenues.

The financing agreement allowed $339 million in bonds through the state of Kentucky's Economic Development Finance Authority to be issued to construct the $252 million arena. The total debt on the bonds, $573 million over 30 years, will be paid through several sources. These include the city's $206 million commitment, $265 million from a tax-increment financing district, $179 million from advertising rights inside the arena, $63 million from luxury box sales, and at least $37 million in arena naming rights. The tax-increment financing district will allow part of the anticipated growth in state taxes to help pay for the arena. The arena's share of that revenue is capped at $265 million, although the project will be able to use the excess revenues to pay down the debt. It is expected to generate $574 million over 20 years.

In September 2008, financing was completed for the new waterfront arena.

== Construction ==
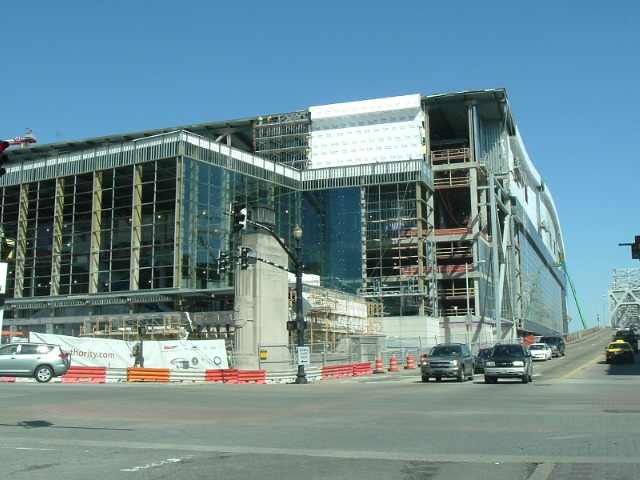
The arena construction site in March 2010

On May 3, 2007, construction began on a new electrical substation for Downtown Louisville. The previous substation, located on the block of River Road, Main, 2nd and 3rd Streets, was relocated across the street at 3rd and River Road. The new substation, projected to cost $63 million, was completed in October 2008, at which time the land that housed the old substation was transferred to the Louisville Arena Authority for construction of the new arena. Work started on the new arena in November 2008. The complex was officially completed on October 10, 2010.

In June 2010, Gov. Steve Beshear and Mayor Jerry Abramson announced a new $3 million streetscape improvement project directly underneath the Clark Memorial Bridge, a three-block area from Main Street to River Road, which will be transformed into a plaza. This includes a new decorative lighting system under the refurbished Clark Memorial Bridge, wide sidewalks, seats, new pedestrian and festival areas, and extensive plantings, making this an inviting promenade for the new KFC YUM! Center. The project will be completed in time for the October 2010 opening of the arena.

In 2010, the glassed-in skywalk system, called Louie Link, was extended across 3rd Street from the new $16 million Skywalk Garage, an eight-level, 860-space parking facility on 3rd Street, to the new KFC Yum! Center.

== Controversy ==
The Task Force meetings were not without controversy. At first, task force member and University of Louisville athletics director Tom Jurich, along with University of Louisville president James Ramsey and Task Force member John Schnatter (founder of Papa John's Pizza), were ardently opposed to a downtown site and supported instead a campus arena, or a new arena built near Freedom Hall at the Kentucky Exposition Center. Jurich and Ramsey would later support the waterfront site. Schnatter, joined by fellow task force member and Humana co-founder David Jones, strongly supported a new arena at the water company site, located four blocks down 2nd Street, or the Exposition Center, which was the cheapest option. They paid over $200,000 for a study that showed the water company site would be much less expensive than the riverfront site. However, the two dropped their lobbying effort after it did not seem to change the minds of the rest of the task force.

== Other sports ==
=== NBA ===
Date	Home team	Score	Away team	Attendance	ref
October 4, 2014	Miami Heat	86–98	New Orleans Pelicans	20,074	
October 7, 2015	Miami Heat	97–100	Orlando Magic	6,123	
October 15, 2016	Miami Heat	96–101	Minnesota Timberwolves	9,672	

=== Mixed martial arts ===
The arena held Kentucky's first UFC event on March 3, 2011, for UFC Live: Sanchez vs. Kampmann. The UFC returned to the arena on June 8, 2024, for UFC on ESPN: Cannonier vs. Imavov.

== See also ==
- Sports in Louisville, Kentucky
- List of attractions and events in the Louisville metropolitan area
- List of NCAA Division I basketball arenas
- List of basketball arenas
