= Nexus of contracts =

The nexus of contracts theory is an idea put forth by a number of economists and legal commentators (most notably Michael Jensen and William Meckling as well as Frank Easterbrook) which asserts that corporations are a collection of contracts between different parties – primarily shareholders, directors, employees, suppliers, and customers. It has replaced the legal theory of the corporation.

Proponents of this theory contend that all disputes about the obligations of a particular corporation should be settled by resort to the methods used to interpret contracts, and that courts should not imply the existence of fiduciary duties on behalf of corporate officers and directors. Alternatively, the nexus of contracts theory can also be viewed as a method of enhancing corporate plausible deniability, insofar as it is a way of "passing the buck" down a chain of contractual obligations and losing all semblance of responsibility in the "nexus." This can pose a practical loophole for corporate entities, a theoretical strength for those wishing to forward corporate ideology, and a legal problem for those who wish to take corporate entities to court. Another strength of this theory of the firm is a firm begins to transcend border and defy simple classification when it is really intertwined by its contracts into a number of different countries and with a number of different stakeholders. It has been suggested that the application of this theory to corporations is undercut by the establishment of the limited liability company ("LLC") as a business form more explicitly formed from a nexus of contracts.
