= Robert M. Lynch =

American businessman

- Born: 1978 (age 47–48); Pittsburgh, Pennsylvania, United States
- Education: University of Rochester, Simon Business School
- Occupation: Business executive
- Known for: CEO of food businesses

Robert M. Lynch (born 1976) is an American businessman and CEO of Shake Shack. He is a former CEO of Papa John's Pizza, replacing Steve Ritchie in August 2019. Ritchie was the successor to founder John Schnatter

Lynch has previously served as the president of Arby's, famously spearheading the chain's “We Have the Meats” campaign.

== Early life ==
Hailing from Pittsburgh, Pennsylvania, Lynch attended college at University of Rochester. He graduated in 1999 with a dual major in political science and economics. He would later graduate from the William E. Simon Graduate School of Business Administration in 2000 with an MBA.

== Career ==
=== Procter and Gamble ===
Lynch was hired in 1999 as a Brand Manager at Procter & Gamble. Throughout his seven-year tenure, he oversaw ad campaigns for the Crest brand line of oral care products.

=== The Kraft Heinz Company ===
In 2006, Lynch left his senior position at Procter & Gamble to become the associate marketing director at The Kraft Heinz Company. Assuming the role of general manager, he oversaw marketing campaign and led delivery of the Heinz Consumer Portfolio's largest profit and loss statement.

=== Taco Bell ===
From 2012 to 2013, Lynch served at Taco Bell as vice president of marketing. During this time, he developed a focus on product innovation campaigns and marketing using innovative menu items.

=== Arby’s ===
Lynch's stint at Taco Bell was cut short due to his recruitment by Arby's Restaurant Group in 2013. He served as the restaurant's Brand President and Chief Marketing Officer until August 2017, when Lynch was promoted to president of the company, a position he held until 2019. In both of these roles, Lynch led brand reinvention and the formation of Inspire Brands. He also served as president of Arby's franchisee association, driving the chain's first new restaurant growth in a decade. Arby's witnessed record sales and profits during his tenure.

=== Papa John's Pizza ===
On August 26, 2019, Lynch overtook the president and CEO positions at Papa John's Pizza in a highly publicized announcement. In the nearly two years he has held the position, Lynch has led the company to improved financial performance, helping it recover from waning sales and stock value. He has spearheaded innovation of new menu items such as the New York Style Pizza, Epic Stuffed Crust Pizza, Shaq-A-Roni, the Garlic Parmesan Crust and implemented superior support for franchises and staff.

== Philanthropy ==
Lynch has directed Papa John's charity contributions to focus on local community outreach and resources for veterans.

Since his tenure as CEO and president, charitable contributions by Papa John's have increased. A large number of charities has benefited from the campaign, including Volunteers of America, UNCF, Boys & Girls Clubs, The Salvation Army as well as various schools and homeless shelters.
