= Papajohn =

Papajohn is a surname, possibly derived from the Greek Papagiannis (Παπαγιάννης). It may refer to:

- Michael Papajohn (born 1964), American actor and stuntman
- George Papajohn, writer for the Chicago Tribune

== See also ==
- Papa John (disambiguation)
- Papa John's Pizza
- Pappajohn v R, a Supreme Court of Canada case about mistake of fact
