= Simon Business School =

Business school at University of Rochester

Coordinates: 43.127149°N 77.631025°W

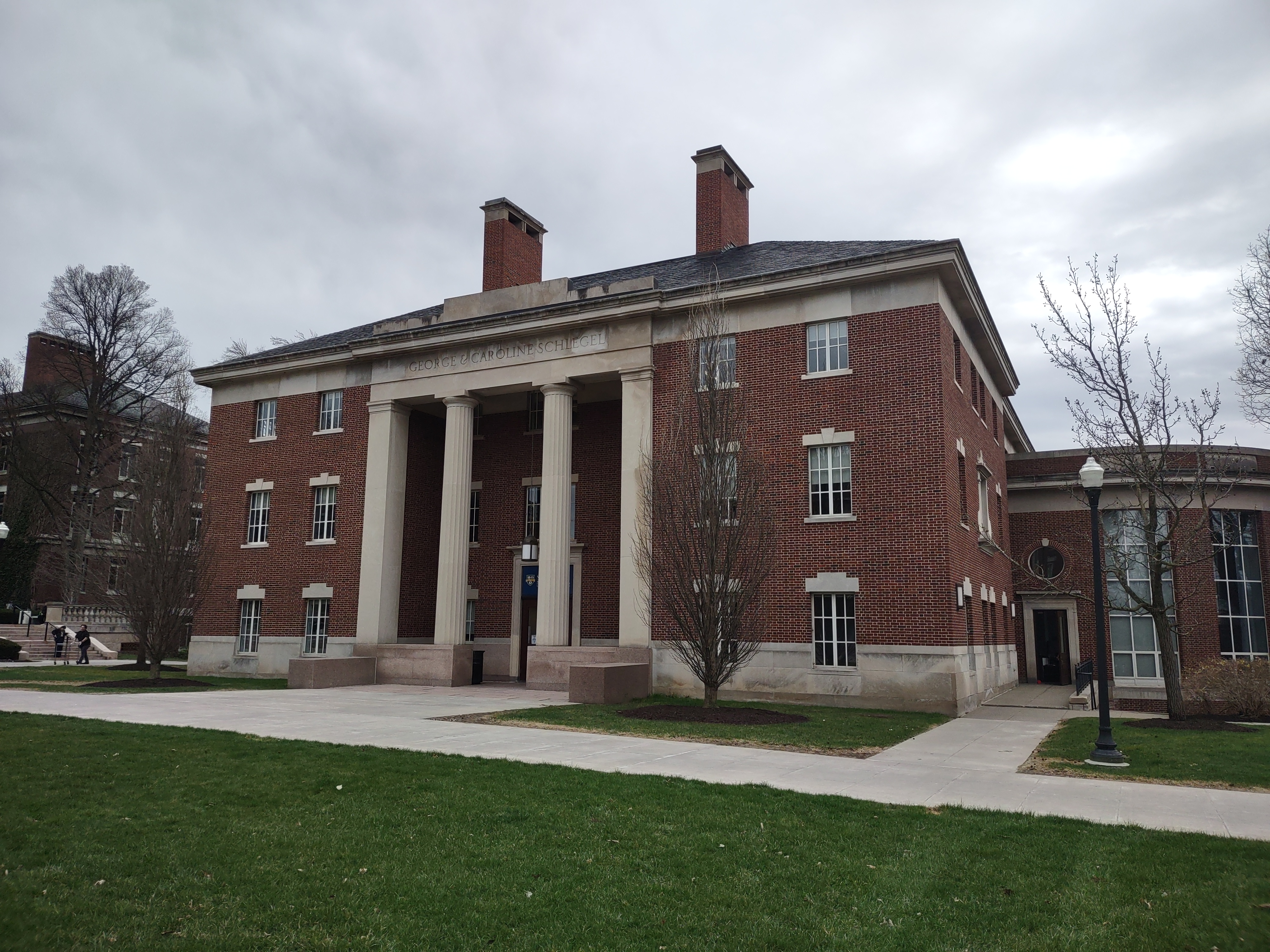
- Former names: School of Business Administration (1958–1962); College of Business Administration (1962–1970); Graduate School of Management (1970–1986); William E. Simon Graduate School of Business Administration (1986–2013)
- Motto: To advance the understanding and practice of management through rigorous thought leadership.
- Type: Private business school
- Established: 1958; 68 years ago
- Parent institution: University of Rochester
- Affiliations: Consortium for Graduate Study in Management
- Endowment: $82.175 million
- Dean: Mitch Lovett (Interim)
- Academic staff: 72
- Postgraduates: 182 Full-Time MBA; 82 Part-Time MBA; 300 MS; 45 PhD
- Location: Rochester, New York, USA
- Campus: Urban
- Website: simon.rochester.edu

Simon Business School (formerly known as the William E. Simon Graduate School of Business Administration) is the business school of the University of Rochester. It is located on the university's River Campus in Rochester, New York. It was renamed in 1986 after William E. Simon (1927–2000), the 63rd United States Secretary of the Treasury. The school's current dean is Mitch Lovett.

Simon Business School offers full-time, part-time, and executive Master of Business Administration (MBA) programs (based in either Rochester or Switzerland), as well as Master of Science (MS) and Doctor of Philosophy (PhD) programs.

== History ==
The University of Rochester started as a small business program in 1958, and awarded its first MBA degree in 1962, but the School's impact in the business world can be traced to a later decision by then University President W. Allen Wallis to create a first-class business school in Rochester. In 1964, he was recruited as dean.

William H. Meckling - who would remain dean for 19 years - was a noted economist known for his analysis and leadership in support of an all-volunteer U.S. armed service. As dean, he committed the school to an economics-based approach to problem solving, recruited a faculty for researches at school, initiated new finance and accounting journals that incorporated economics, eliminated boundaries between functional departments, and transformed what had been a small, undergraduate and evening business school into a graduate business program.

As a result of work by Meckling and Michael C. Jensen - one of the faculty members he recruited - and other faculty members, the school became known for its contributions to the areas of finance, accounting, and organizational theory. The faculty's contributions, in turn, helped shape the research agenda of a generation of business scholars around the world, influencing teaching in graduate business programs and changing how many companies and executives in the US and abroad conduct business.

In 1986, another milestone in the school's history occurred when the school was renamed to the "William E. Simon Graduate School of Business Administration". William E. Simon, a financial entrepreneur and former U.S. Treasury Secretary, believed in the principles and ideals of the school. He offered his name and an enduring financial commitment to the school's continued success. He chaired the Executive Advisory Committee from its inception in 1986 until his death in June 2000.

Today, Sevin Yeltekin, who succeeded Andrew Ainslie in 2020, serves as dean of Simon Business School. Yeltekin, the first woman to lead the Simon School, previously served as senior associate dean and professor at Carnegie Mellon’s Tepper School of Business.

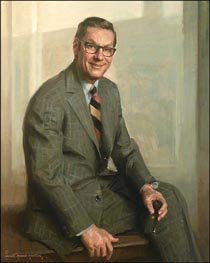
William E. Simon

Deans
| Name | Tenure |
|---|---|
| John M. Brophy | 1962 – 1964 |
| William H. Meckling | 1964 – 1983 |
| Paul W. MacAvoy | 1983 – June 30, 1990; September 1, 1991 – June 30, 1992 |
| Charles I. Plosser | July 1, 1990 – August 31, 1991 (acting); July 1, 1992 – August 31, 1993 (acting); September 1, 1993 – June 30, 2003 |
| Mark A. Zupan | January 1, 2004 – June 30, 2014 |
| Andrew S. Ainslie | July 1, 2014 – June 30, 2020 |
| Sevin Yeltekin | July 1, 2020 – June 30, 2025 |
| Mitch Lovett | July 1, 2025 – (acting) |

== MBA programs ==
=== Full-time MBA program ===
The Full-Time Master of Business Administration (MBA) program is two-year in duration and begins in August. With an average full-time MBA enrollment of 100 students per class,

=== Rankings ===
In 2026, the school was ranked 33rd in the U.S. by Bloomberg Businessweek. The MBA program also ranked 32nd on the U.S. News & World Report's 2025 ranking of best graduate-level business schools. QS World University Rankings ranked Simon's MBA program as 39th in the United States and 100-110th in the world. Financial Times placed Simon's MBA program at 62nd in the world as well.

Business school rankings

United States
- QS MBA: 39
- Bloomberg MBA: 33
- USNWR MBA: 34

Global
- QS MBA: 100-110
- Financial Times MBA: 62

=== Executive MBA programs ===
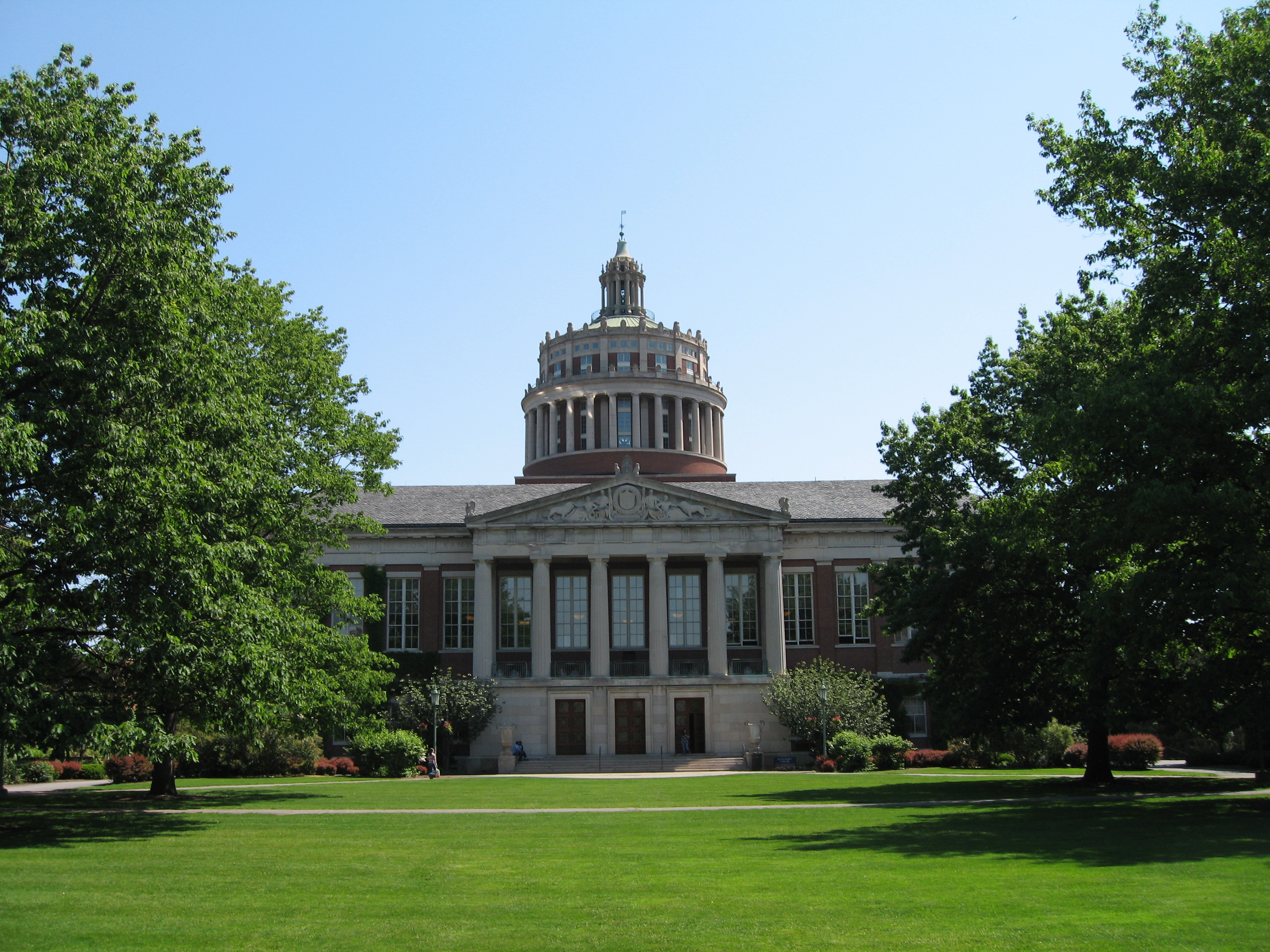
University of Rochester, River Campus

Simon's Executive MBA program is offered on the Rochester campus (as well as in Bern, Switzerland), in conjunction with the Institut für Finanzmanagement at the Universität Bern. The Bern program is equivalent to the Rochester program and is taught by Simon School faculty and European scholars. Students are typically sponsored by their organizations and earn a University of Rochester degree. Like Rochester's Executive MBA students, the students of the Rochester-Bern Executive MBA program in Switzerland come from a wide variety of countries and cultures. Bern students spend their four-week summer term in Rochester studying alongside American students.

== MS programs ==
Simon Master of Science (MS) programs generally only require one year of full-time study. Students also have the opportunity to take some classes with MBA candidates, work on multicultural teams, and participate in a variety of extracurricular activities. The school offers MS programs in accountancy, business analytics, finance, health care management, management, marketing analytics, and medical management.

The University of Rochester's Hajim School of Engineering and Applied Sciences also offers a Master of Technical Entrepreneurship and Management (T.E.A.M.) program, with some courses completed at Simon Business School.

== MS in Health Care Management in New York City ==
The MS in Health Care Management curriculum is designed for working professionals who want to develop the skills to better evaluate their organizations, optimize care delivery, and prepare for the next round of fundamental industry change.

Simon Business School's NYC home is located in the Tribeca area of lower Manhattan.

== PhD program ==
Introduced in 1965, Simon Business School offers a PhD programs with a variety of concentrations.

The most common majors are Accounting, Finance, Marketing, Computer Information Systems, and Operations Management. Regardless of the major, all students' first-year studies include a core program designed to build a firm foundation of mathematics, statistics, and economics. While the majority of the courses are taken in common by all the incoming students, there is some specialization. This specialization gets more specific in the second year when the students concentrate on their major and minor fields of study.

== Notable alumni and students ==
- David Anderson - former literary historian and business consultant
- Arunas A. Chesonis – chief executive officer (CEO) and chairman of the board, Sweetwater Energy; former chairman of the board and CEO, PAETEC Holding Corp.
- Tim Cost – president, Jacksonville University
- Gerry Gitner – former CEO, Trans World Airlines (TWA); co-founder and former president, People Express Airlines (PEOPLExpress); former senior executive, Pan American World Airways (Pan Am); former chairman and CEO, Pan Am World Services
- Pramit Jhaveri – former CEO, Citibank India
- René F. Jones - Chief executive officer (CEO) of M&T Bank
- Robert M. Lynch - CEO of Shake Shack
- Ed Mitzen - founder and CEO of Fingerpaint Group
- Robert E. Rich Jr. – senior chairman, Rich Products Corporation
- Dominic Seiterle – former Canadian Olympic rower and gold medalist

== Academic contributions and research ==
The school is also home to three academic journals in management: the Journal of Accounting and Economics, the Journal of Financial Economics, and the Journal of Monetary Economics.

== See also ==
- List of United States business school rankings
- List of business schools in the United States
