= Michael C. Jensen =

American economist (1939–2024)

- Born: November 30, 1939; Rochester, Minnesota, U.S.
- Died: April 2, 2024 (aged 84); Sarasota, Florida, U.S.
- Known for: Co-founding and editing the Journal of Financial Economics; Financial economics Corporate finance SSRN co-founder

Academic background
- Education: Macalester College University of Chicago
- Doctoral advisor: Merton Miller

Academic work
- Institutions: Monitor Group (2000–2009); Harvard University (1985–2000); University of Rochester (1967–1988)

Michael Cole Jensen (November 30, 1939 – April 2, 2024) was an American economist who worked in the field of financial economics. From 1967 to 1988, he was on the University of Rochester's faculty. Between 2000 and 2009 he worked for the Monitor Company Group, a strategy-consulting firm which became "Monitor Deloitte" in 2013. Until 2000, he held the position of Jesse Isidor Straus Professor of Business Administration at Harvard University. He died in Sarasota, Florida on April 2, 2024, at the age of 84.

Jensen was highly influential in the financial economics discipline. Much of his work focused on agency problems within organizations, especially publicly traded corporations. He co-founded and edited the Journal of Financial Economics, one of the discipline's most influential journals. He also co-founded the Social Science Research Network in 1994.

Journalists and economists have characterized Jensen's work as influentially championing free-market capitalism and the principle of shareholder wealth-maximization.

== Early life ==
Born in Rochester, Minnesota, United States, he received his A.B. in Economics from Macalester College in 1962. He received both his M.B.A. (1964) and Ph.D. (1968) degrees from the University of Chicago Booth School of Business, notably working with professors Merton Miller (1990 co-winner of the Nobel Prize in Economics) and Eugene Fama (2013 co-winner of the Nobel Prize in Economics).

== Career ==
Between 1967 and 1988, Jensen taught finance and business administration at the William E. Simon Graduate School of Business Administration of the University of Rochester, culminating in his 1984-1988 appointment as the LaClare Professor of Finance and Business Administration. In 1974, he co-founded the Journal of Financial Economics. From 1977 to 1988, he served as the founding director of the university's Managerial Economics Research Center. He joined the Harvard Business School on a half-time appointment in 1985 (dividing his time between Rochester and Harvard) before taking a full-time appointment at the latter institution in 1988. Jensen was also forward looking regarding how the internet would reshape how information is disseminated. SSRN was founded in 1994, at a time when few people had heard of the World Wide Web. In 2000, Jensen retired from academic work, retaining emeritus status at Harvard, upon assuming his position at Monitor.

Jensen was also a visiting scholar at the University of Bern (1976), Harvard University (1984–1985, when he joined the faculty), and the Tuck School of Business at Dartmouth College (2001–2002). In 1992, he was president of the American Finance Association (AFA), one of four classmates from the University of Chicago that were elected president of the AFA (the others being Hans Stoll, Richard Roll, and Myron Scholes). He became a member of the American Academy of Arts and Sciences in 1996. Since 2002, he has been a board member of the European Corporate Governance Institute.

In 1974, the first issue of the Journal of Financial Economics was published. Jensen was the primary editor until about 1990, when he stepped down, partly due to health issues. The Jensen Prize in corporate finance and organizations research at the journal is named in his honor.

== Research ==
Jensen played an important role in the academic discussion of the capital asset pricing model, of stock options policy, and especially of corporate governance.

He developed a method of measuring fund manager performance, the so-called Jensen's alpha. Based upon his 1968 University of Chicago Ph.D. dissertation, Jensen posited that fund manager abnormal performance should be based upon a fund's average return relative to how much risk it exposed investors to, and how other risky assets had done. As an example, if the annual return on the stock market was 10% in a year when the risk-free rate of interest, as proxied by the return on Treasury bills, was 2%, a fund that was 80% as risky as the overall market should have an expected return of 2% + 0.8 times (10%-2%), or 8.4%, based on the capital asset pricing model referred to above. If the fund had a return of 8.1%, it underperformed by 0.3% relative to its expected return. This measure became known as Jensen's alpha, and became widely used to measure the performance of mutual funds and other investments by both academics and practitioners.

Jensen's best-known work is the 1976 Journal of Financial Economics article he co-authored with William H. Meckling, "Theory of the Firm: Managerial Behavior, Agency Costs and Ownership Structure". One of the most widely cited economics papers of the last 50 years, it implied the theory of the public corporation as an ownerless entity, made up of only contractual relationships, a field pioneered by Ronald Coase. The paper noted that if a manager only receives a fraction of the benefits that he or she adds to the firm, the manager will not work as hard to maximize value as he or she would if 100% of the incremental benefits flowed to the manager. The paper hypothesized that an advantage of debt financing was that with a smaller amount of equity financing, a manager could own a larger percentage of the equity, and thus have better incentives to maximize firm value. The paper also hypothesized that outside investors would be aware of these incentive effects, and thus would be willing to assign a higher valuation to a firm that had higher managerial equity ownership.

His 1983 paper Reflections on the Corporation as a Social Invention argued that corporations' sole responsibility was to maximize shareholder value, based on the assumption that the stock market accurately reflected a company's value, the assumption of the efficient-market hypothesis.

In 1986, Jensen published a short article, "Agency Costs of Free Cash Flow, Corporate Finance, and Takeovers" in the American Economic Review that sought to explain the buyout boom that was occurring. At the time, buyouts were referred to as leveraged buyouts (LBOs) because they frequently involved high amounts of debt financing. The paper argued that the managers of some profitable publicly traded firms were not maximizing shareholder value because managers were overinvesting or sitting on retained earnings. Jensen argued that if the company substituted debt for equity financing, the managers would be forced to pay out profits as interest and principal to debtholders, and in so doing would incentivize managers to make sure that there were enough profits to meet the debt payments, and in the process increase firm value.

Jensen's 1976 and 1986 articles are seminal corporate finance articles. Prior to their publication, almost all of the academic articles on payout policy and capital structure published after 1960 used the framework introduced by Merton Miller and Franco Modigliani in their articles on these topics, which assumed that the operating decisions of companies were not affected by payouts and capital structure. Jensen's articles, by contrast, explicitly hypothesized that these decisions did affect the operating decisions. After 1986, almost all of the academic articles on these topics have adopted Jensen's framework in which operating decisions are causally affected by financial decisions (endogenous), rather than unaffected (exogenous).

A 1990 Harvard Business Review article, CEO Incentives: It's Not How Much You Pay, But How by Jensen and Kevin J. Murphy, prescribed executive stock options as a mechanism to incentivize executives to maximize shareholder value. The justification they gave was that shareholders were the "residual claimants" of the corporation so they had the sole right to profits. The idea that shareholders are the sole residual claimants was later challenged by some legal scholars, and some (such as Stout 2002) actively reject it, in favor of other arguments for shareholder primacy. However, recent literature (such as Rojas 2014) builds upon Jensen's work arguing in favor of a dynamic model of the corporation and theory of corporate governance.

After Jensen and Murphy (1990), Congress passed Section 162(m) of the U.S. Internal Revenue Code (1993), making it cost effective to pay executives in equity. As a result, executives had increased financial incentives to focus their efforts on increasing the company's stock price. In the short run, some executives even manipulated accounting numbers (Enron, Global Crossing) to achieve the goal, although these firms were hardly the first companies to manipulate accounting numbers. Other companies focused on long-term value creation, even if it negatively affected short-term earnings per share (EPS).

Jensen acknowledged that market prices were not always right. In 2005 he published "Agency Costs of Overvalued Equity" In Financial Management.

Jensen collaborated several times with Werner Erhard. The backbone of their studies was an ontological/phenomenological model. He also collaborated with Eugene Fama on two articles that were published in the 1983 Journal of Law and Economics dealing with agency problems, that is, conflicts in the goals of managers and shareholders.
