= Mark Zupan (academic) =

American professor

Mark Zupan (born 1959) is the president of Alfred University in Alfred, New York.

Zupan had been the John M. Olin Distinguished Professor of Economics and Public Policy, Director of the Bradley Policy Research Center and a dean at University of Rochester's Simon Business School.

Zupan also has served as a Director/Trustee for Financial Institutions, Steuben Trust, Constellation Brands, the Farash Corporation, PAETEC Holdings, Stocker Yale, and The Harley School.

== Career ==
Zupan began his tenure as the 14th President of Alfred University on July 1, 2016. He was named to the position by the University's Board of Directors on February 10, 2016. His inauguration took place on October 22, 2016. Zupan has outlined his goals for the university, and shared his thoughts about ways Alfred University can partner with the local community in the Hornell Evening Tribune.

He was dean at the Simon Business School at the University of Rochester from 2004 to 2013. Zupan championed an $85 million fundraising campaign that added ten new endowed professorships, increased philanthropic support for scholarships by over 300 percent, and more than doubled annual discretionary giving. He established an undergraduate business program in partnership with the College of Liberal Arts and Sciences. He launched specialized MS programs in finance, marketing, accounting, management, and medical management in Rochester, and MS in finance and management programs in New York City, doubling overall graduate student enrollments at Simon.

Zupan served as dean and professor of economics at the University of Arizona's Eller College of Management from 1997 to 2003.

Before his appointment at Arizona, Zupan taught at the University of Southern California's Marshall School of Business, where he also served as associate dean of master's programs. He was a teaching fellow in Harvard's Department of Economics while pursuing his doctoral studies at MIT, and he has been a visiting faculty member at the Amos Tuck School of Business Administration at Dartmouth College.

Zupan has a BA degree in economics from Harvard University and a PhD in economics from the Massachusetts Institute of Technology.

== Expertise ==
Zupan's fields of specialization include industrial organization, regulation, and political economy. He has published over 20 refereed articles in leading scholarly journals. His commentaries have appeared in media outlets such as the New York Times, Wall Street Journal, Los Angeles Times, BusinessWeek.com, Huffington Post, Kiplinger, Financial Times of London, San Francisco Chronicle and the Democrat and Chronicle. Zupan is the co-author of two books, Microeconomic Theory and Applications (with E. K. Browning) published by John Wiley and Sons, and Microeconomic Cases and Applications (with T.W. Gilligan and A.M. Marino), published by HarperCollins. In 2017, Cambridge University Press published his latest book titled Inside Job: How Government Insiders Subvert the Public Interest.

== Research ==
Zupan's research interests include water policy, the influence of economics and ideological preferences on the political behavior of voters and elected officials, industrial organization, regulation and political economy. He has received research grants from the National Science Foundation and the Center for International Business Education and Research at the University of Southern California.

Zupan is also the author of numerous scholarly articles which have appeared in publications including the American Economic Review, Journal of Law and Economics, RAND Journal of Economics, Public Choice, and Journal of Regulatory Economics. His opinion pieces have appeared in The Wall Street Journal, The New York Times, the Financial Times of London, Los Angeles Times, Arizona Republic, BusinessWeek.com, Democrat and Chronicle (Rochester, NY) and San Francisco Chronicle. He has served as co-editor of the journal Economic Inquiry, and has also been on the editorial boards of Public Choice, Journal of Business Economics, and Research in Law and Economics.

== Academic history ==
Fields of Specialization:

Industrial Organization
Regulation
Political Economy

=== Research grants ===
International Development Award, Center for International Business Education and Research, University of Southern California, 1995-1997
Dean’s Fellowship, School of Business Administration, University of Southern California, September 1989-August 1992
Zumberge Innovative Research Fund Grant, University of Southern California, July 1990-June 1991
National Science Foundation Fellowship, September 1981-May 1984

== Professional affiliations and activities ==
AACSB Board of Directors, 2010-Present
AACSB Re-Accreditation Committee Chair, Darden School of Business, University of Virginia
AACSB Re-Accreditation Committee, Graduate School of Management, UC Riverside
AACSB Re-Accreditation Committee, McDonough School of Business, Georgetown University
GMAC, Board of Directors, 2006-2009
Economic Development Strategy Team of Monroe County, 2004-2006
LEAD Council of Deans, January 2001-2005
AACSB Re-Accreditation Committee, Carlson School of Management, University of Minnesota, 2002
Teaching Team, FACS Summer Institute for Journalists, 1999-2000
Co-Editor, Economic Inquiry, 1992-1997
Member, Editorial Board, Economic Inquiry, 1990-1992
Member, Editorial Board, Journal of Business Economics, 1992-2000
Member, Editorial Board, Public Choice, 1990-2003
Member, Editorial Board, Research in Law and Economics, 1993-1999
Coordinator, Economic Inquiry-sponsored conference on Economics and Sociology in honor of Gary Becker and James Coleman, 1995
Coordinator, Economic Inquiry-sponsored conference on Empirical Advances in Political Economic in honor of George Stigler and Gordon Tullock, 1993
Referee for American Economic Review, Econometrics, Journal of Law and Economics, Journal of Political Economy, Journal of Public Economics, National Science Foundation, Quarterly Journal of Economics, and RAND Journal of Economics

== Community and corporate involvement ==
Board member, Financial Institutions, Incorporated, 2021-present
Board member, Steuben Trust, 2017-2021
Board member, Western New York Regional Economic Development Council, 2016-present
Board Member, Harley School, 2008-2015
Board Member, Constellation Brands, 2007-2015
Board Member, Farash Corporation Board, 2007-2012
Board Member, PAETEC, 2006-2011
Board Member, The Communications Institute, 2006-2009
Board Member, Stocker-Yale, 2005-2007
Member, St. Michael’s Development Committee, 2000-2003
Board Member, Greater Tucson Economic Council, 1998-2003
Board Member, Northern Trust Bank of Arizona, 2000-2003
Member, Tucson Breakfast Club, 1998-2003
Chair and Cabinet Member, United Way of Tucson and Southern Arizona, Campaign 2000
Board Member, University of Arizona Science and Technology Park, 1998-2003

== Awards and honors ==
Omicron Delta Kappa, Alfred University, 2017
Burlington Resources Foundation Faculty Achievement Award for Outstanding Scholarship, University of Southern California (campus-wide), 1992
Golden Apple Teaching Award, School of Business Administration, University of Southern California, 1989
Beta Gamma Sigma Faculty Initiate, School of Business Administration, University of Southern California, 1988
Joseph R. Levenson Memorial Teaching Prize, Harvard University (campus-wide), 1985
Allyn Young Teaching Prize, Economics Department, Harvard University, 1985
Allyn Young Teaching Prize, Economics Department, Harvard University, 1984

Academic offices
Vacant Title last held by Charles I. Plosser	Dean of the William E. Simon Graduate School of Business Administration; January 1, 2004 – June 30, 2014	Succeeded by Andrew S. Ainslie
Preceded by Charles M. Edmondson	President of Alfred University; July 1, 2016 – present	Incumbent
