= Pramit Jhaveri =

Indian banker and ex-CEO of Citi

Pramit Jhaveri is an Indian banker and ex-CEO of Citi. He served as Citi's India CEO from 2010 to 2019 and is the longest-serving India chief of the bank. Prior to his role as CEO, Pramit set up Citi's investment banking business in India.

In 2019, he was elevated to the position of vice Chairman – banking, capital markets and advisory (BCMA), Asia Pacific, Citi with the responsibility of enhancing key client relationships in the region.

== Early life ==
Pramit was born in Mumbai in the family of a jeweler businessman. Pramit completed his schooling from Campion School, Mumbai and earned his Bachelor of Commerce from Sydenham College in Mumbai. He holds an MBA specialising in finance and economics from Simon Business School of the University of Rochester, which is located in Rochester, New York, United States.

== Career ==
Pramit's joined Citi India in 1987 as a campus recruit from the Simon School of Business. He served Citi in various roles and became the CEO heading Citi India business in 2010.

In 2016, Pramit was made the Cluster Head for South Asia with oversight of Bangladesh and Sri Lanka.

Citi was also repeatedly recognized as the best foreign bank in the country during this time.

== Associations ==
Pramit is also managing director and head of India Investment Banking at Citigroup Global Markets India Private Limited.

Pramit is a director on the Global Board of U.S.-India Business Council, and Pratham Education Foundation. He is also on the board of trustees of India Foundation for the Arts and on the Council of Advisors for American India Foundation.

== Awards ==
In 2016, Pramit received the Distinguished Alumnus Award from his alma mater Simon School of Business, University of Rochester, USA.

== Family ==
Pramit is married to Mukeeta, and they have a son, Prithvir, and a daughter, Nynika. Mukeeta was an investment banker with Merrill Lynch and quit her job after marriage. Pramit, along with his family, lives in Mumbai.

Pramit is an avid tennis player and art collector.
