= David Anderson (academic) =

American academic

David Anderson (born August 4, 1952) is a former college professor. He was trained as a literary historian at Princeton University (Ph.D. 1980), where he studied with D. W. Robertson, and at universities in Italy (beginning with support from a Fulbright Fellowship, 1978), especially the scholarly circle around Giuseppe Billanovich at the Catholic University of Milan.

It was as a visiting scholar at Milan that he completed his study of the post-classical interpretations of Statius' epic poem Thebaid and their influence on Boccaccio and Chaucer, published as Before the Knight's Tale (University of Pennsylvania Press, 1988), and identified in scattered manuscript sources a previously unrecognized commentary that was shown to be present in Boccaccio's library and used by that author in his works: "Boccaccio's Glosses on Statius," Studi sul Boccaccio (1996).

At the University of Pennsylvania (1980–1988), he was the first male member of the faculty to take an extended parenting leave. At the time, the request was unusual, and his act occasioned public discussion of gender bias in employment policies and was the subject of a front-page article in the Daily Pennsylvanian, "Mr. Mom: Paternity Leave Allows English Prof to Raise Son".

In 1986 he curated an exhibition and catalogue of manuscripts and early printed books illustrating Chaucer's works and their cultural influences, Sixty Books Old and New (New Chaucer Society, 1986). The exhibition was held at the University of Pennsylvania and the Rosenbach Foundation and was supported by several Philadelphia-area charitable organizations, which made possible the distribution of copies of the catalogue to English teachers in the Philadelphia public school district. Anderson's other publications include Pound's Cavalcanti (Princeton University Press, 1983), which remains "invaluable" to Ezra Pound scholars.

He won the 1988-89 Rome Prize in Post-Classical Humanistic Studies. Anderson held appointments in Europe from 1989 to 1995, first as a Fellow of the American Academy in Rome and then at the University of Tübingen.

In 1996 he took an MBA degree in accounting and finance at the University of Rochester's Simon Graduate School of Business Administration. He then worked as a professional business appraiser and consultant until 2017. Anderson is a member of the board of Rydberg Technologies, LLC He lives in Princeton, New Jersey. He has three children, David, Maria, and Sophia.
