= Kevin J. Murphy (professor) =

Professor at the University of Southern California

Kevin James Murphy (born 1957) is a professor at the University of Southern California. Since 2006, Murphy has held the Kenneth L. Trefftzs Chair in Finance at the USC Marshall School of Business. He is also a professor of law at the USC Gould School of Law and Professor of Economics at USC's College of Letters, Arts & Science.

== Career ==
Before teaching at USC, Kevin Murphy was a professor at the Harvard Business School and the University of Rochester's William E. Simon Graduate School of Business Administration.

The Institute for Scientific Information's Web of Knowledge compiles a Highly Cited list composed of the most highly cited individuals within each of 21 broad subject categories; Murphy has been listed under Economics/Business since at least 2003.

Murphy is a member of the American Economic Association and an associate editor of the Journal of Corporate Finance and Journal of Financial Economics. He received his PhD in economics from the University of Chicago in 1984 and his BA, summa cum laude, from the University of California, Los Angeles in 1979.

== Research List ==
Murphy, Kevin., Sandino, Tatiana. (2016) "Compensation Consultants and the Level, Composition and Complexity of CEO Pay".

Barron, Daniel., Gibbons, Robert., Gil, Ricard., Murphy, Kevin. (2016) "Relational Adaptation under Reel Authority".

Jensen, Michael., Murphy, Kevin., Wruck, Eric. (2016) "CEO Pay and what to do about it: Restoring integrity into executive compensation and capital-market relations", Harvard Business School Press.

Murphy, Kevin., Zabojnik, Jan. (2016) "Managerial Capital and the Market for CEOs".

Murphy, Kevin. (2013) "Regulating Banking Bonuses in the European Union: A Case Study in Unintended Consequences", European Financial Management, 19, 631-657.

Murphy, Kevin. (2013) "Executive Compensation: Where we are, and how we got there", Handbook of the Economics of Finance, Elsevier Science North Holland, 4, 2A, 211-356.

Fernandes, Nuno., Ferreira, Miguel., Matos, Pedro., Murphy, Kevin. (2013) "Are US CEOs Paid More? New International Evidence", Review of Financial Studies, 26, 323-367.

Conyon, Martin., Fernandes, Nuno., Ferreira, Miguel., Matos, Pedro., Murphy, Kevin. (2013) "The Executive Compensation Controversy: A Transatlantic Analysis ", Executive Remuneration and Employee Performance-Related Pay: A Transatlantic Perspective, Oxford University Press, 1, Part I, 8-115.

Boeri, Tito., Lucifora, Claudio., Murphy, Kevin. (2013) "Executive Remuneration and Employee Performance-Related Pay: A Transatlantic Perspective", Oxford University Press.

Murphy, Kevin. (2012) "Pay, Politics, and the Financial Crisis", Rethinking the Financial Crisis, Russell Sage Foundation, 12.

Murphy, Kevin. (2012) "The Politics of Pay: A Legislative History of Executive Compensation ", The Research Handbook on Executive Pay, Edward Elgar, 1.

Murphy, Kevin. (2012) "CEO Bonus Plans and How to Fix Them".

Baker, George., Gibbons, Robert., Murphy, Kevin. (2011) "Relational Adaptation".

Murphy, Kevin. (2010) "Executive Pay Restrictions for TARP Recipients: An Assessment".

Murphy, Kevin., Sandino, Tatiana. (2010) "Executive Pay and "Independent" Compensation Consultants. Journal of Accounting and Economics 49 (3).", Journal of Accounting and Economics, 49, 147-262.

Murphy, Kevin. (2009) "Compensation Structure and Systemic Risk".

Baker, George., Gibbons, Robert., Murphy, Kevin. (2008) "Strategic Alliances: Bridges Between 'Islands of Conscious Power'", Journal of the Japanese and International Economies, 22, 146-163.

Lowry, Michelle., Murphy, Kevin. (2007) "Executive Stock Options and IPO Underpricing", Journal of Financial Economics, 85, 39-65.

Murphy, Kevin., Oyer, Paul. (2004) "Discretion in Executive Incentive Contracts", University of Southern California.

Hall, Brian., Murphy, Kevin. (2003) "The Trouble with Stock Options", Journal of Economic Perspectives, 17, 49-70.

Murphy, Kevin. (2003) "Explaining Executive Compensation: Managerial Power versus the Perceived Cost of Stock Options", University of Chicago Law Review, 69, 847-869.

Murphy, Kevin. (2003) "Stock-Based Pay in New Economy Firms", Journal of Accounting and Economics, 34, 129-147.

Hall, Brian., Murphy, Kevin. (2002) "Expensing will improve compensation decisions", Boston Globe.

Murphy, Kevin., Gibbons, Robert., Baker, George. (2002) "Relational Contracts and the Theory of the Firm", Quarterly Journal of Economics, 117, 39-84.

Murphy, Kevin., Hall, Brian. (2002) "Stock Options for Undiversified Executives", Journal of Accounting and Economics, 33, 3-42.

Murphy, Kevin., Conyon, Martin. (2002) "Stock-based executive compensation", Corporate Governance Regimes: Convergence and Diversity,Oxford University Press, 26, 625-646.

Baker, George., Gibbons, Robert., Murphy, Kevin. (2001) "Bringing the Market Inside the Firm", American Economic Review Papers and Proceedings, 92, 212-18.

Murphy, Kevin., Hall, Brian. (2001) "Option Value Does Not Equal Option Cost", WorldatWork Journal, 10.

Murphy, Kevin. (2000) "Performance Standards in Incentive Contracts", Journal of Accounting and Economics, 30, 245-78.

Conyon, Martin., Murphy, Kevin. (2000) "The Prince and the Pauper? CEO Pay in the US and UK", Economic Journal, 110, F640-71.

Hall, Brian., Murphy, Kevin. (2000) "Optimal Exercise Prices for Executive Stock Options", American Economics Review Papers and Proceedings,90, 209-214.

Baker, George., Gibbons, Robert., Murphy, Kevin. (1999) "Informal Authority in Organizations", Journal of Law, Economics, and Organizations, 15, 56-73.

Murphy, Kevin. (1999) "Executive Compensation", Handbook of Labor Economics, Elsevier Science North Holland.

Hallock, Kevin., Murphy, Kevin. (1999) "The Economics of Executive Compensation", Edward Elgar Publishing.

Baker, George., Jensen, Michael., Murphy, Kevin. (1998) "Compensation and Incentives: Practice vs. Theory", Journal of Finance, 43, 593-616.

Murphy, Kevin. (1998) "Executive Stock Options: An Economist's Perspective", American Compensation Association.

Murphy, Kevin. (1997) "Executive Compensation and the Modern Industrial Revolution", International Journal of Industrial Organization, 15, 417-25.

Murphy, Kevin. (1997) "Disney Offers a Model for Executive Compensation", Los Angeles Business Journal.

Murphy, Kevin. (1997) "CEO Pay and Downsizing: The Social Consequences", American Compensation Association.

Murphy, Kevin. (1996) "Reporting Choice and the 1992 Proxy Disclosure Rules", Journal of Accounting, Auditing, and Finance, 11, 497-515.

Dial, Jay., Murphy, Kevin. (1995) "Incentives, Downsizing, and Value Creation at General Dynamics", Journal of Financial Economics, 37, 261-314.

Murphy, Kevin. (1995) "Politics, Economics, and Executive Compensation", University of Cincinnati Law Review, 63, 713-748.

Baker, George., Gibbons, Robert., Murphy, Kevin. (1994) "Subjective Performance Measures in Optimal Incentive Contracts", Quarterly Journal of Economics, 109, 1125-56.

Murphy, Kevin. (1994) "Governance, Behavior, and Performance of State and Corporate Pension Funds", Harvard University.

Jensen, Michael., Murphy, Kevin. (1994) "Compensation at Lexerd Systems", Harvard Business School Press.

Murphy, Kevin. (1993) "Executive Compensation in Corporate America 1993", United Shareholders Association.

Murphy, Kevin., Dial, Jay. (1993) "Compensation and Strategy and General Dynamics (A), (B)", Harvard Business School Press.

Murphy, Kevin., Zimmerman, Jerold. (1993) "Financial Performance Surrounding CEO Turnover", Journal of Accounting and Economics, 16, 273-315.

Murphy, Kevin. (1992) "Executive Compensation in Corporate America 1992", United Shareholders Association.

Gibbons, Robert., Murphy, Kevin. (1992) "Does Executive Compensation Affect Investment?", Journal of Applied Corporate Finance, 5.

Gibbons, Robert., Murphy, Kevin. (1992) "Optimal Incentive Contracts in the Presence of Career Concerns: Theory and Evidence", Journal of Political Economy, 100, 468-505.

Murphy, Kevin. (1992) "Performance Measurement and Appraisal: Motivating Managers to Identify and Reward Performance", Performance Measurement, Evaluation, and Incentives, Harvard Business School Press.

Murphy, Kevin. (1991) "Merck & Co., Inc. (A), (B), (C)", Harvard Business School Press.

Murphy, Kevin., Jensen, Michael. (1990) "A New Survey of Executive Compensation: Full Survey and Technical Appendix to 'CEO Incentives - It's Not How Much You Pay but How", Simon School of Business, University of Rochester.

Jensen, Michael., Murphy, Kevin. (1990) "CEO Incentives: It's Not How Much You Pay, But How", Harvard Business Review.

Jensen, Michael., Murphy, Kevin. (1990) "Performance Pay and Top-Management Incentives", Journal of Political Economy, 98, 225-64.

Gibbons, Robert., Murphy, Kevin. (1990) "Relative Performance Evaluation for Chief Executive Officers", Industrial and Labor Relations Review,43, 30S-51S.

Murphy, Kevin. (1989) "The Control and Performance of State-Owned Enterprises: Comment", Privatization and State-Owned Enterprises,Kluwer Academic, 59-68.

Murphy, Kevin. (1987) "Executive Compensation in Regulated Firms", William E. Simon Graduate School of Business Administration.

Murphy, Kevin. (1986) "Incentives, Learning, and Compensation: A Theoretical and Empirical Investigation of Managerial Labor Contracts", RAND Journal of Economics, 17, 59-76.

Murphy, Kevin. (1986) "Top Executives Are Worth Every Nickel They Get", Harvard Business Review, 64.

Murphy, Kevin. (1985) "Corporate Performance and Managerial Remuneration: An Empirical Investigation", Journal of Accounting and Economics, 7, 11-42.

Murphy, Kevin. (1985) "Is Executive Compensation Related to Company Performance?", Rochester Management Review.

Jensen, Michael., Murphy, Kevin. (1984) "Beware the Self-Serving Critics", New York Times.
