= Business for Good =

American charitable organization

- Formation: July 2021; 5 years ago
- Founder: Ed Mitzen, Lisa Mitzen
- Type: Charitable organization, venture philanthropy
- Headquarters: Saratoga Springs, New York
- Location: United States
- Website: https://bfg.org

Business for Good Foundation is a 501(c)(3) non-profit foundation based in Saratoga Springs, New York. It was founded in 2020 by philanthropists Ed Mitzen and Lisa Mitzen. Business for Good's goal is to address inequities that impact underserved communities in the Capital District, including food insecurity, housing instability, and education gaps. The organization provides capital and resources to local businesses, communities in need, and minority entrepreneurs through donations, grants, and profits from foundation-owned businesses.

In 2022, Business for Good received an honorable mention in Fast Company's World Changing Ideas Awards for Impact Investing.

== History ==
In 2020, the Mitzen family purchased Bread Basket Bakery in Saratoga Springs, turning the eatery into an organization that donates all profits to local organizations fighting food insecurity. The first donation was made in October 2020, of $25,000 to Troy-based nonprofit Capital Roots.

Business for Good publicly launched in July 2021, when the purchase of Hattie's Restaurants was announced. As part of the purchase, the original owners and staff kept their jobs, and were given raises and benefits.

From January to October 2021, BFG donated $5.4 million in grants and resources to 25 local non-profits.

BFG made a $1 million donation to the Mohawk-Hudson Humane Society in 2022, the largest in the shelter's 135-year history.

In January 2022, BFG purchased the historic University Club in downtown Albany, and later donated use of the building to the newly formed Albany Black Chamber of Commerce & Social Club. In May, the foundation donated $1 million to the three known living survivors of the 1921 Tulsa race massacre.

In May 2026, Business for Good Foundation launched the Generating Reslient Opportunity for America's Workforce (GROW) program. The program focuses on workforce development, including funding to support early career pivots, address the disparity between industry pay and teaching salaries, and fund automation retraining.
