= René F. Jones =

American businessman

René Francis Jones
- Born: 1965 or 1966 (age 59–60); Ayer, Massachusetts, US
- Education: Boston College (BA); University of Rochester’s Simon School of Business (MBA)
- Occupation: Banker
- Spouse: Brigid Doherty (m. 1998)
- Children: 2

René F. Jones is an American businessman and the chief executive officer of M&T Bank. As of 2022, he is one of four Black CEOs in the Fortune 500.

== Early life and education ==
Born into a biracial military family, Jones was raised in Ayer, Massachusetts. His father met his mother in Belgium while serving as a soldier in World War II. He is the youngest of six children.

Jones graduated from Boston College with a BS degree and from University of Rochester’s Simon School of Business with an MBA.

== Career ==
In 1992, Jones joined M&T Bank as an executive associate.

From 2005 to 2016, Jones was CFO of M&T Bank.

In 2017, he was appointed as chairman and CEO of M&T Bank.

In 2022, he was elected a director of the Federal Reserve Bank of New York. His term will run through the end of 2024.

He is on the boards at The Jacobs Institute, the Burchfield Penney Art Center, Federal Reserve Bank of New York, Massachusetts Historical Society, Pan-Mass Challenge, and Boston College.
