= Ed Mitzen =

American businessman

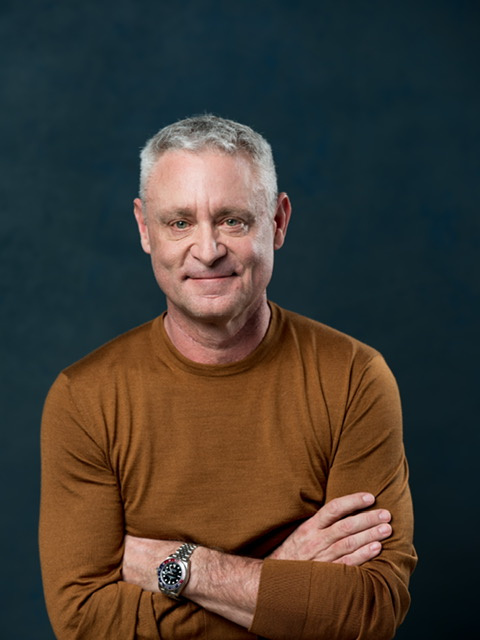
- Occupations: Business executive, philanthropist
- Known for: Fingerpaint Group, Business for Good
- Spouse: Lisa Mitzen
- Website: www.edmitzen.com; www.fingerpaint.com

Ed Mitzen is an American entrepreneur, business executive, and philanthropist. He is the founder and former CEO of Fingerpaint Group, and also the co-founder of the non-profit organization Business for Good. Prior to founding Fingerpaint, Mitzen co-founded the ad agency Palio, which was sold to inVentiv Health in 2006.

== Early life and education ==
Mitzen grew up in Voorheesville, New York. He attended Syracuse University, where he earned a bachelor's degree in biology. Mitzen also attended the University of Rochester's Simon Business School where he earned a Master of Business Administration.

== Career ==
Mitzen worked as a pharmaceutical representative and served as the vice president of product management at Cardinal Health, before founding the consulting business, Creative Healthcare Solutions, in 1997. In 1999, he founded the advertising agency Palio in Saratoga Springs, New York. After selling the company to inVentiv Health in 2006, Mitzen served in various roles until leaving to found the advertising and marketing firm Fingerpaint in 2008.Mitzen was CEO of Fingerpaint until 2026, where he currently serves as board member.

As of 2022, Fingerpaint has more than 700 employees with locations in Albany, New York, Columbus, Ohio, Conshohocken, Pennsylvania, and Scottsdale, Arizona. Fingerpaint's notable clients include DreamWorks, General Electric, Emma Willard School, Celgene and Ferring Pharmaceuticals, amongst others.

In 2021, Mitzen and his wife personally donated $4 million to pay down the student loan debt of all Fingerpaint employees, eliminating 83 of 131 people's loans. After purchasing the University Club of Albany building in 2022, Mitzen donated use of the building to the Albany Black Chamber of Commerce, which opened its doors in February 2023.

In November 2026, Mitzen launched healthcare and sports marketing agency Superfan Health, based in Manhattan.

=== Business for Good ===
In October 2020, Mitzen co-founded The Business for Good Foundation with his wife Lisa. The 501(c)(3) non-profit operates multiple businesses in the Greater Capital Region that offer living wages and healthcare benefits to employees, and donates all profits back to local charitable causes. The foundation also assists organizations like Shelters of Saratoga to help provide affordable living to low-income residents.

In 2021, Business for Good donated $5.4 million to 25 local non-profit organizations. The foundation also provides support and financial assistance to entrepreneurs starting businesses, and development support for existing, growing businesses.

In 2022, Business For Good received an honorable mention in Fast Company's World Changing Ideas Awards. In May 2022, the foundation donated $1 million to the three known living survivors of the 1921 Tulsa Race Massacre.

== Personal life ==
Mitzen and his wife, Lisa, reside in Saratoga Springs. The couple has donated to Code Blue, a program designed to house homeless during the winter, since 2012. In 2017, they donated funds to build a 6,500-square foot homeless shelter in Saratoga Springs.

From 2015 to 2020, Mitzen served on the board of directors for Double H Ranch, and was elected to Syracuse University's board of trustees in May 2022. He previously served on the board or directors for The Hyde Collection, Saratoga Performing Arts Center, Union Graduate College, the Waldorf School of Saratoga Springs, and the Saratoga Care Foundation.

== Published works ==
- More Than A Number: The Power of Empathy and Philanthropy in Driving Ad Agency Performance (2020)
- Wealthy and White: Why Guys Like Me Have to Show Up, Step Up, and Give Others a Hand Up (2023)

== Awards and honors ==
2016 - Med Ad News Manny Awards Industry Person of the Year

2017 - Digiday Boss of the Year Award

2018 - Saratoga Living Person of the Year

2021 - Saratoga Bridges Community Builders Award

2022 - Siena College Civitella Community Impact Award

2022 - Capital Region Chamber Changemakers Award

2025 - Worth's Worthy100
