= Jeff Smith (hedge fund manager) =

American businessman

Jeffrey Chad Smith or Jeff Smith, (born 1972 or 1973) is an American hedge fund manager who has headed Starboard Value since April 2011.

== Early life and education ==
Smith grew up in Great Neck, Long Island. His mother was a real estate broker, and his father founded the Fresh Juice Company. In 1994, Smith received a degree in economics from the Wharton School at the University of Pennsylvania.

== Career ==
Smith began his career in the mergers and acquisitions department at Société Générale. From August 1994 to February 1996, he worked as a financial analyst in the mergers and acquisitions department at LSG Advisors. He was vice president of strategic development and investor relations at Fresh Juice from February 1996 to January 1998, becoming its director in April 1996.

After Fresh Juice was sold in 1998, Smith moved to Ramius Capital, a hedge fund and private equity firm founded by Peter A. Cohen. Smith served as a partner and managing director at Ramius. In 2002, he and a colleague, Mark Mitchell, launched the Starboard Value investment strategy at Ramius. Smith became executive managing director of Cowen Group in January 2004. Peter Feld joined the Starboard Value division in 2005. In 2009, Ramius merged with Cowen Group.

=== Starboard Value ===
In 2011, Starboard went independent, with Smith as CEO.

On September 12, 2017, Smith said that Perrigo, a manufacturer of store-brand pharmaceuticals, and Altaba, formerly Yahoo, were his favorite stock picks.

In December 2014, following Starboard Value's takeover of Darden Restaurants, Fortune published a profile of Jeff Smith in which William Cohen described him as "[t]he most feared man in corporate America." Starboard had replaced Darden's entire board and Smith became Darden's chairman while owning less than 10% of the company. The article described the victory as a landmark for shareholder activism, noting that activists had gained increasing influence over corporate boards and management.

=== Other positions ===
Smith served as chairman of the board of Phoenix Technologies from November 2009 to November 2010. He was director of S1 Corporation from May 3, 2006 to September 2008, of Kensey Nash from December 2007 to February 2009, of Actel from March 18, 2009 to October 2010, and of Zoran from March 2011 to August 2011.

He served as a director of SurModics from January 2011 to August 2012, as independent director of Regis Corporation from October 2011 to October 2013, and as a director of Quantum from May 2013 to May 2015. He has been director of AOL since May 2012. He was independent non-executive chairman of Darden Restaurants, from October 2014 to April 2016 and has been that firm's director since October 2014.

He has been independent director of Advance Auto Parts, since November 2015, and its independent chairman since May 2016. He served as an independent director of Yahoo! from April 2016 to June 2017 and an independent director of Perrigo since February 2017. He has also served on the boards of Jotter Technologies and Office Depot.

== Personal life ==
In 1999, he married Marnie Blake Naiburg, a litigation associate at Windels, Marx, Davies & Ives and three years his senior. Rabbi Joseph Potasnick of New York performed the ceremony at the Jewish Temple Beth Torah in Melville, N.Y.
