= Citibank India =

Indian private sector bank

- Company type: Subsidiary
- Industry: Banking; Financial services
- Founded: 1902; 124 years ago
- Parent: Citigroup

Citibank India is the Indian subsidiary of Citigroup. In March 2023, Citibank India's consumer banking division was sold to Axis Bank. After the sale, Citibank India continued to provide corporate and institutional banking services in the country.

== History ==
Citibank began operations in 1902 in Calcutta (Kolkata).

In the late 1980s and 1990s, the division was one of the first banks to offer credit cards in India.

In 1992, Citibank India was alleged to have played the leading role in allowing or facilitating the market manipulation that drove up prices of shares on the Bombay Stock Exchange during the 1992 Indian stock market scam. After an investigation by the Federal Reserve, four officials at the bank resigned. In September 1994, India fined the bank $16.29 million, the most of any bank of the 20 banks implicated in the scandal, which were fined a total of $47 million.

In 2010, Pramit Jhaveri, became chief executive officer.

In 2011, the company was fined Rs 25 lakh for violations of know your customer and anti–money laundering rules after a fraud of Rs 400-crore was perpetrated via one of the company's branches. In 2019, Citibank paid Rs 4.5 crore to settle allegations by the Securities and Exchange Board of India of failure to adequately supervise an employee after the employee used the bank's infrastructure to forge bank statements of clients.

Ashu Khullar was named chief executive officer in 2019.

== Sale of consumer banking division ==
In April 2021, Citigroup announced that it would exit the consumer banking operations in 13 countries including India. Citigroup announced that it will continue to serve larger clients and institutions in these countries.

In 2022, Axis Bank announced the acquisition of Citibank India's consumer banking business for ₹12,325 crore ($1.6 billion).

The acquisition was completed in March 2023 at a lower price of ₹11,603 crore ($1.41 billion) due to customer attrition and decrease in deposits. All Citibank retail branches were rebranded as Axis Bank, with Axis Bank absorbing 97 percent of Citibank India's workforce of 3,200 people.
