= Starboard Value =

American hedge fund

Starboard Value LP
- Formerly: Ramius Capital
- Type: Private Limited partnership (LP)
- Industry: Investment Management
- Founded: 2002; 24 years ago
- Founders: Jeffrey Smith; Mark Mitchell
- Headquarters: New York City, United States
- Key people: Jeffrey Smith (CEO)
- Website: starboardvalue.com

Starboard Value is an American hedge fund founded in 2002 by Jeffrey Smith and Mark Mitchell, with Smith as CEO.

== History ==
Starboard Value began as part of Ramius Capital in 2002. Peter Feld joined Smith and Mitchell in 2005.

Starboard Value merged with the Cowen Group in 2008, and was Cowen's hedge-fund until 2011, when it went independent. Smith, Mitchell, and Feld all stayed with Starboard.

== Structure ==
Starboard has a five-member board of directors. As of February 2019, the five directors were John Leonard, chief executive officer of Intellia Therapeutics; Jeffrey Smith, Starboard's own chief executive officer; Janet Vergis, chairman of the board at Amneal Pharmaceuticals; James Tyree, chairman of Tyree & D'Angelo Partners; and Steven Shulman, managing partner of Shulman Family Ventures.

== Investments and activist campaigns ==
In 2011, Starboard won seats on the boards of SurModics, a maker of biopharmaceuticals, and Regis, a chain of hair-cutting salons.

In December 2011, Starboard sought to gain seats on AOL's board, charging that the firm's CEO, Tim Armstrong, was "wasting money by funding the losses at Patch, a network of local-news websites," and calling on Armstrong to "return to shareholders much of the more than $1 billion it received from the sale of its patents to Microsoft in 2012." Although Starboard lost a proxy battle six months later, Armstrong followed Starboard's advice, spinning off Patch and returning the $1 billion from Microsoft to its shareholders. Consequently, the value of Starboard's AOL stock more than doubled.

After accumulating a 15% stake in Office Depot, Starboard asked for its CEO, Neil Austrian, to be fired, and urged that the firm complete its merger with Office Max. Office Depot gave Starboard three board seats. Starboard also called for a merger between Office Depot and Staples, but the Federal Trade Commission ruled against it for anti-trust reasons, and a judge agreed with the FTC's verdict.

In November 2017, Starboard Value took a 10.7% stake in Mellanox Technologies, an Israeli semiconductor firm. Asserting that Mellanox was spending too much on research and development and other expenses, Starboard urged the company to improve its margins. In January 2018, Starboard Value tried to remove the entire Mellanox board.

In December 2017, Starboard Value bought a 9.9% stake in Cars.com, which it considered to be undervalued and potentially salable.

In August 2018, Starboard Value disclosed that it had accumulated a 5.8% stake in Symantec and had nominated five directors to Symantec's board. Symantec responded that it was evaluating the Starboard nominations and had not yet scheduled its 2018 Annual Meeting. In September 2018, Symantec announced that three nominees of Starboard were joining the Symantec board, two with immediate effect (including Starboard Managing Member Peter Feld) and one following the 2018 Annual Meeting of Stockholders.

In addition, Starboard has taken activist positions in Smithfield Foods, Calgon Carbon, Tessera Technologies, Yahoo, Brink's Home Security, Macy's, Darden Restaurants, and Papa John's Pizza.

In 2020, Starboard defenestrated Keith Jackson from onsemi and replaced him with Hassane El-Khoury.

In October 2022, Starboard took a 7.4% stake in Vertiv, claiming it was undervalued, seeking operational improvements, with an opportunity to boost margins. Vertiv shares rose more than 10% following the news.

In August 2023, it was announced Starboard had acquired a 5% stake in the Tampa-based company, Bloomin’ Brands which owns several American casual dining restaurant brands such as Outback, Carrabba’s, Fleming’s Prime, and Bonefish Grill.

== Darden takeover ==
In October 2014, Smith effectively took control of Darden Restaurants, a Fortune 500 company that owns Olive Garden and Longhorn Steakhouse. Among Smith's criticisms was that the pasta at Olive Garden was inadequately salted. On the HBO program Last Week Tonight, host John Oliver did a three-minute comedy bit based on Starboard's presentation. As of February 1, 2018, it had been seen by nearly four million viewers. While owning less than 10% of the firm, Smith replaced the entire board and became Darden's chairman. A December 2014 Fortune profile of Starboard's Jeff Smith described the victory as a landmark for shareholder activism, noting that activists had gained increasing influence over corporate boards and management. The campaign was notable for replacing the entire board of a Fortune 500 company, an outcome that had occurred only a few times in the preceding years and never before at a company of Darden's size. As of June 2016, Darden's stock was up by almost 60% since Starboard took over.

== Profitability ==
Starboard generated annualized returns of 15.5% with 84% of its activist campaigns being profitable between 2002 and 2014. Since 2004, Starboard has replaced over 80 directors on about 30 boards.
