= Papa John's =

American pizza restaurant chain

Papa John's International, Inc.

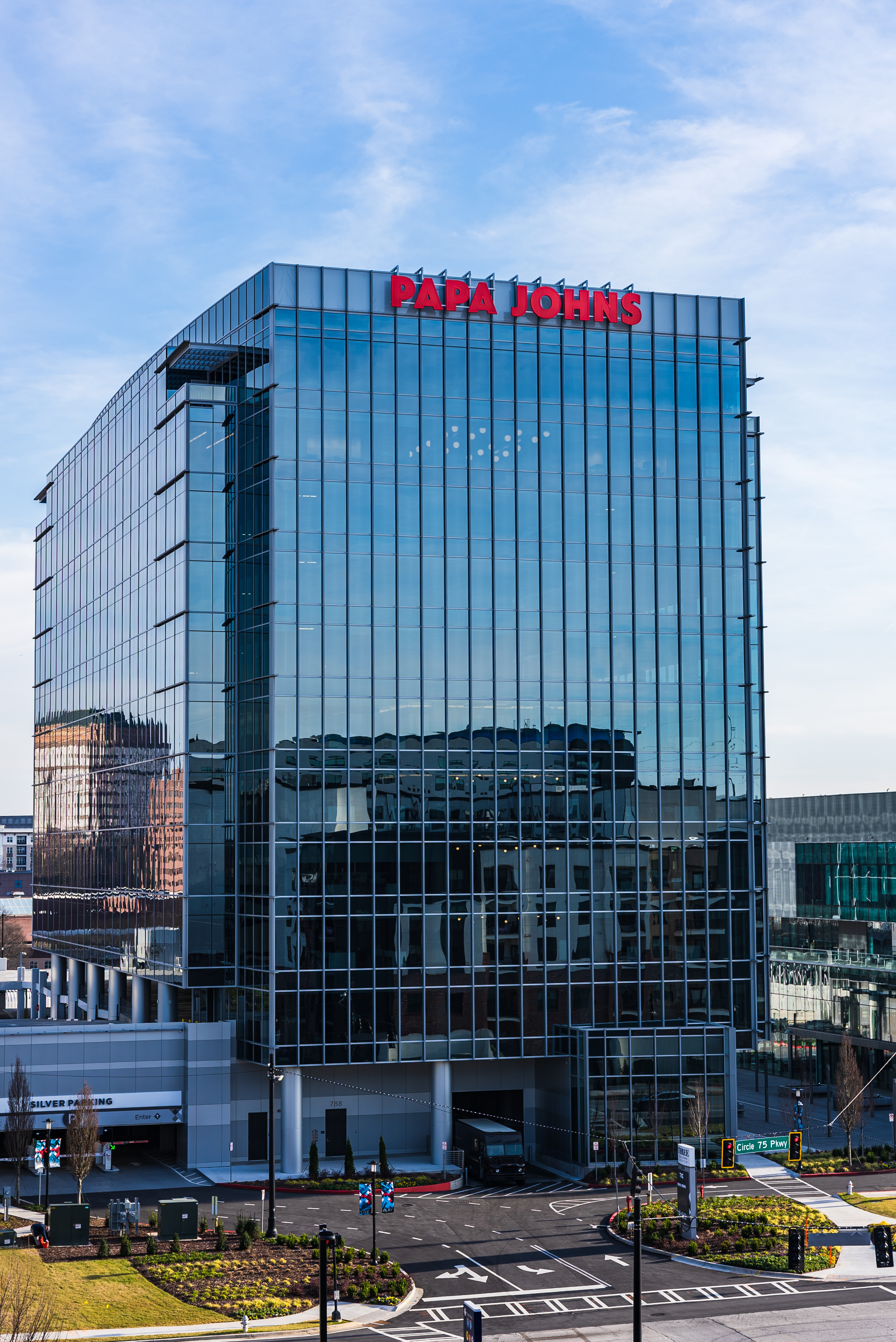
- Headquarters in Cumberland, Georgia
- Trade name: Papa Johns
- Type: Public
- Traded as: Nasdaq: PZZA; S&P 600 component
- Industry: Restaurant
- Genre: Pizzeria; Fast food
- Founded: October 2, 1984; 42 years ago
- Founder: John Schnatter
- Headquarters: Jeffersontown, Kentucky, U.S. Cumberland, Georgia, U.S.
- Number of locations: 5,400 (December 2020)
- Key people: Todd Penegor (president & CEO); Max Wetzel (CMO); Jim Norberg (COO)
- Products: Pizza; chicken wings; dessert
- Revenue: ▲US$1.81 billion (FY December 29, 2020)
- Operating income: ▲US$90.253 million (FY December 29, 2020)
- Net income: ▲US$57.932 million (FY December 29, 2020)
- Total assets: ▲US$872.770 million (FY December 29, 2020)
- Total equity: ▼ −US$266.939 million (FY December 29, 2020)
- Number of employees: ~16,700 (FY December 29, 2020)
- Website: papajohns.com

Papa John's International, Inc., trading as Papa Johns, is an American pizza restaurant chain founded by John Schnatter in Jeffersonville, Indiana, in 1984. The company went public in 1993 and had expanded to 1,500 restaurants by 1997. As of 2023, it is the fourth largest pizza delivery restaurant chain in the United States, with headquarters in the Louisville, Kentucky, and Atlanta, Georgia, metropolitan areas.

As of March 2022, Papa John's global presence reached over 5,500 locations in 49 countries and territories. Schnatter stepped down as CEO in 2018 and later resigned as chairman. Robert M. Lynch became CEO in 2019 and Todd Penegor succeeded him in 2024.

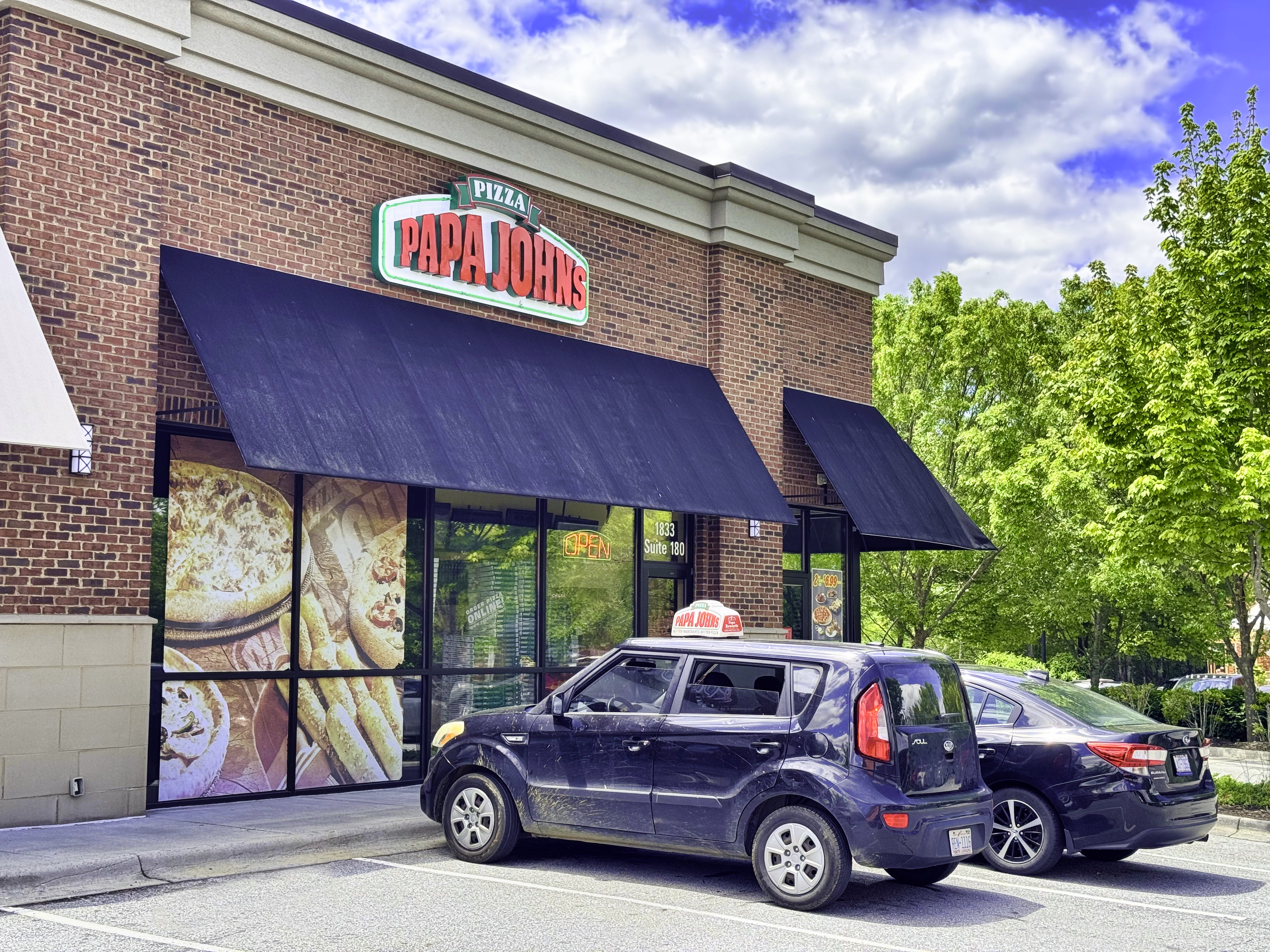
A Papa John's restaurant in Asheville, North Carolina

== History ==
=== 1984–2009 ===
Papa John's restaurant was founded in 1984 when "Papa" John Schnatter installed an oven inside a broom closet in the back of his father's tavern, Mick's Lounge, in Jeffersonville, Indiana. He sold his 1971 Camaro Z28 to buy US$1,600 worth of used pizza equipment and began selling pizzas to the tavern's customers out of the converted closet. A year later, he moved into an adjoining space. Papa John's also introduced a dipping sauce for pizza that year.

The company went public in 1993 following an initial public offering, becoming listed on the NASDAQ under the symbol PZZA. A year later it had 500 stores, and by 1997 it had opened 1,500 stores. In 2009, Schnatter bought the Camaro back after offering a reward of $250,000 for the car.

=== 2010s ===
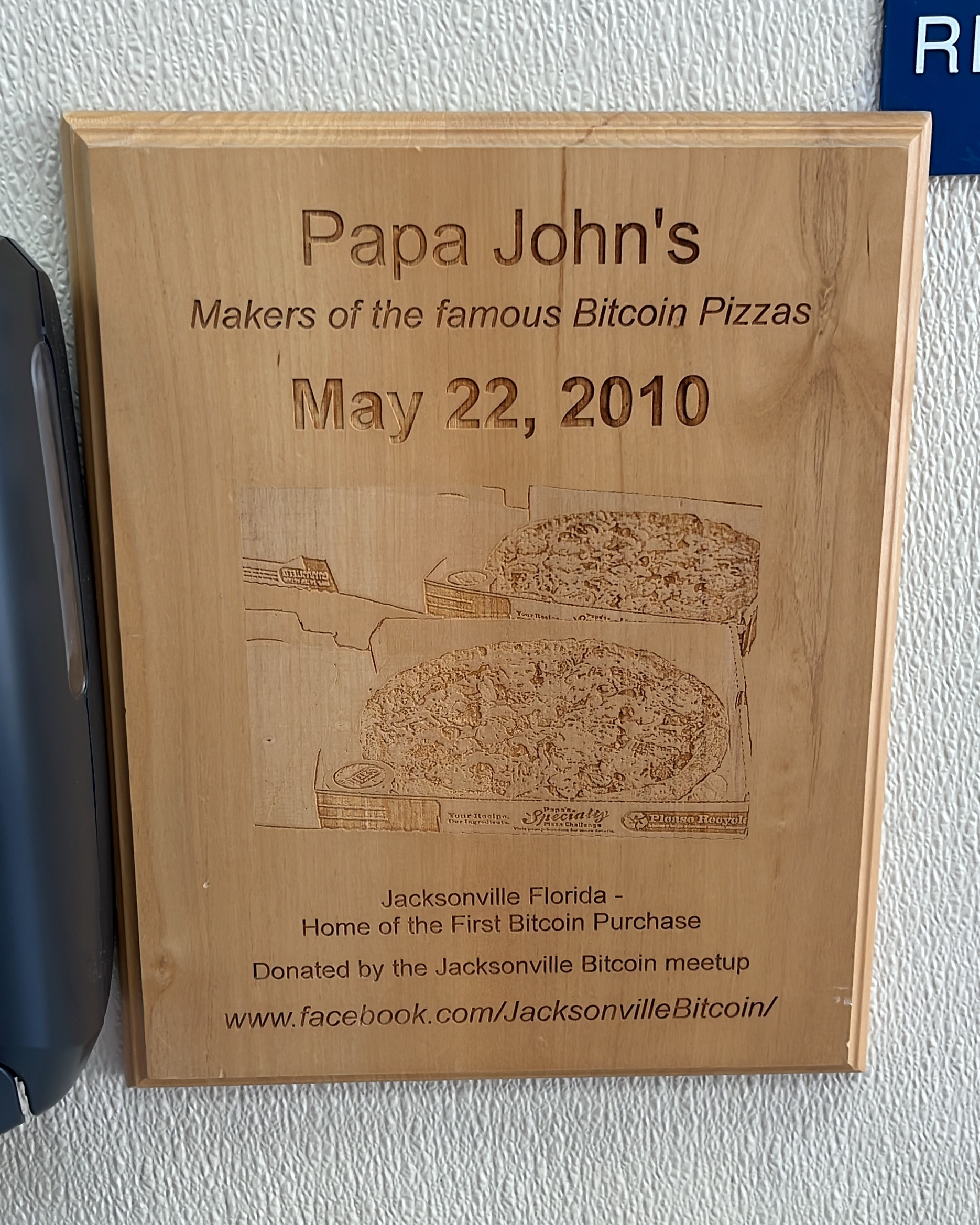
The plaque at the Papa John's franchise on Atlantic Blvd in Jacksonville, Florida, from where two pizzas were made and delivered for the first notable retail bitcoin transaction

The first notable Bitcoin retail transaction involving physical goods was paid on May 22, 2010, by exchanging 10,000 mined BTC for two pizzas delivered from a Papa John's on Atlantic Boulevard in Jacksonville, Florida. Some cryptocurrency users have celebrated May 22 as "Bitcoin Pizza Day".

==== Schnatter's departure ====
Schnatter stepped down as CEO of Papa John's Pizza on January 1, 2018, in favor of company president Steve Ritchie, while remaining chairman. Papa John's and the NFL ended their sponsorship agreement after Schnatter blamed the NFL kneeling controversy for declining same-store sales across Papa John's franchises.

Schnatter resigned as chairman of the company's board of directors on July 18, 2018, after admitting that he had used a racial slur during a meeting.

The activist hedge fund Starboard Value invested $200 million in Papa John's in February 2019. Starboard CEO Jeff Smith become the chairman, and former Pinnacle Entertainment CEO Anthony Sanfilippo joined the board. Papa John's later reached a settlement with Schnatter under which he left the company's board of directors, withdrew his lawsuits, and abandoned plans to seek another board seat.

Schnatter began selling his shares in May 2019 and reduced his ownership stakes to 4% over the following year. Arby's President Robert M. Lynch replace Steve Ritchie as CEO in August 2019.

=== 2020s ===
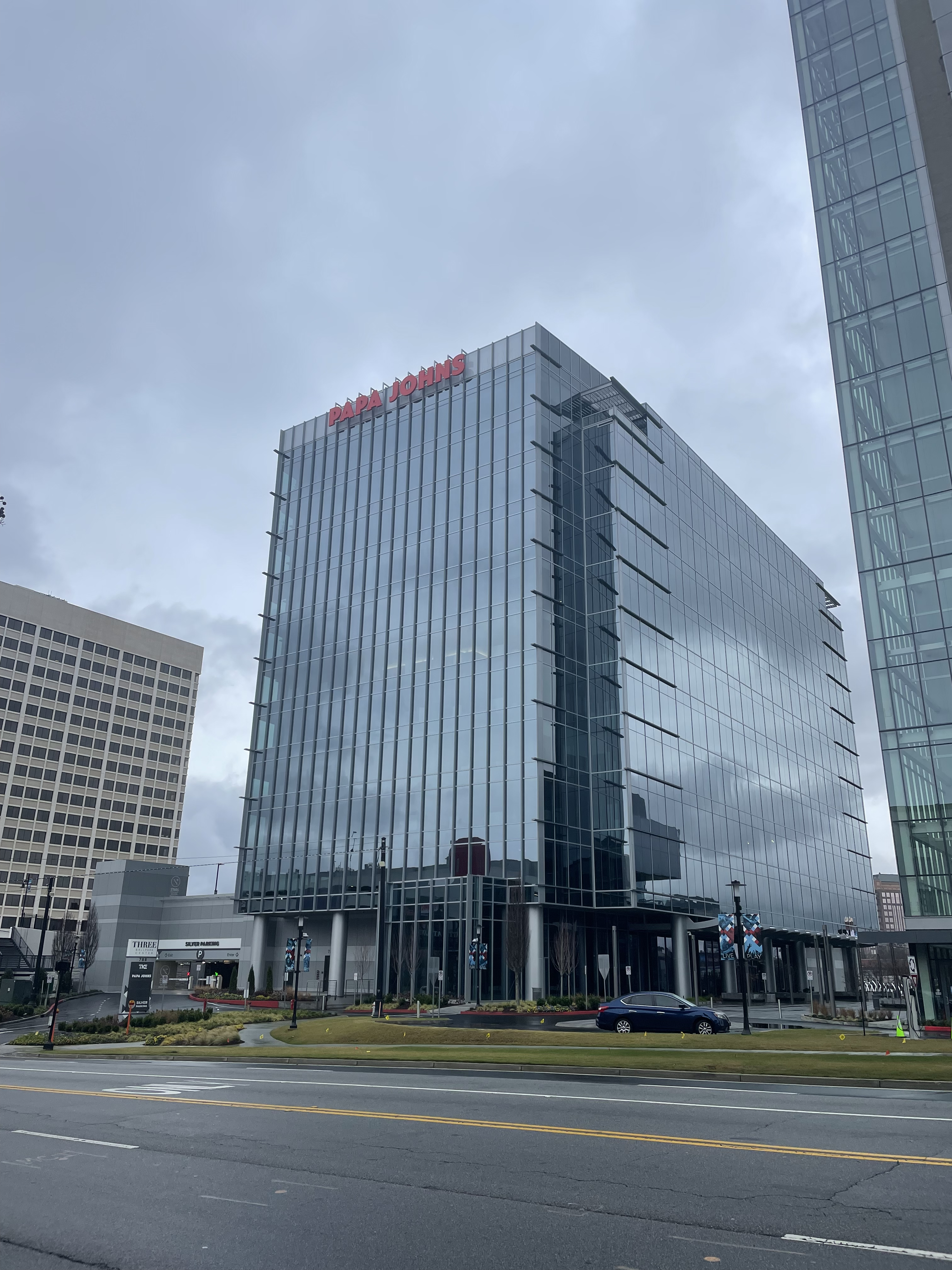
Papa John's corporate HQ at Three Ballpark Center

Papa John's established a new global headquarters at Three Ballpark Center at The Battery Atlanta in the Atlanta metropolitan area in 2020. Its existing headquarters in Jeffersontown, Kentucky was retained for its IT, supply chain, and legal departments.

Papa Johns suspended its business operations in Russia in March 2022 in response to the 2022 Russian invasion of Ukraine, but independent franchisee-owned locations remained open.

Todd Penegor was named President and CEO in August 2024.

Papa Johns announced plans to close 300 of its 3,500 U.S. restaurants by the end of 2027, and reduce its corporate workforce by approximately 7% to cut costs after declining sales.

== Operations ==
Papa John's primarily takes carryout and delivery orders, although some restaurants have tables and chairs for dining in.

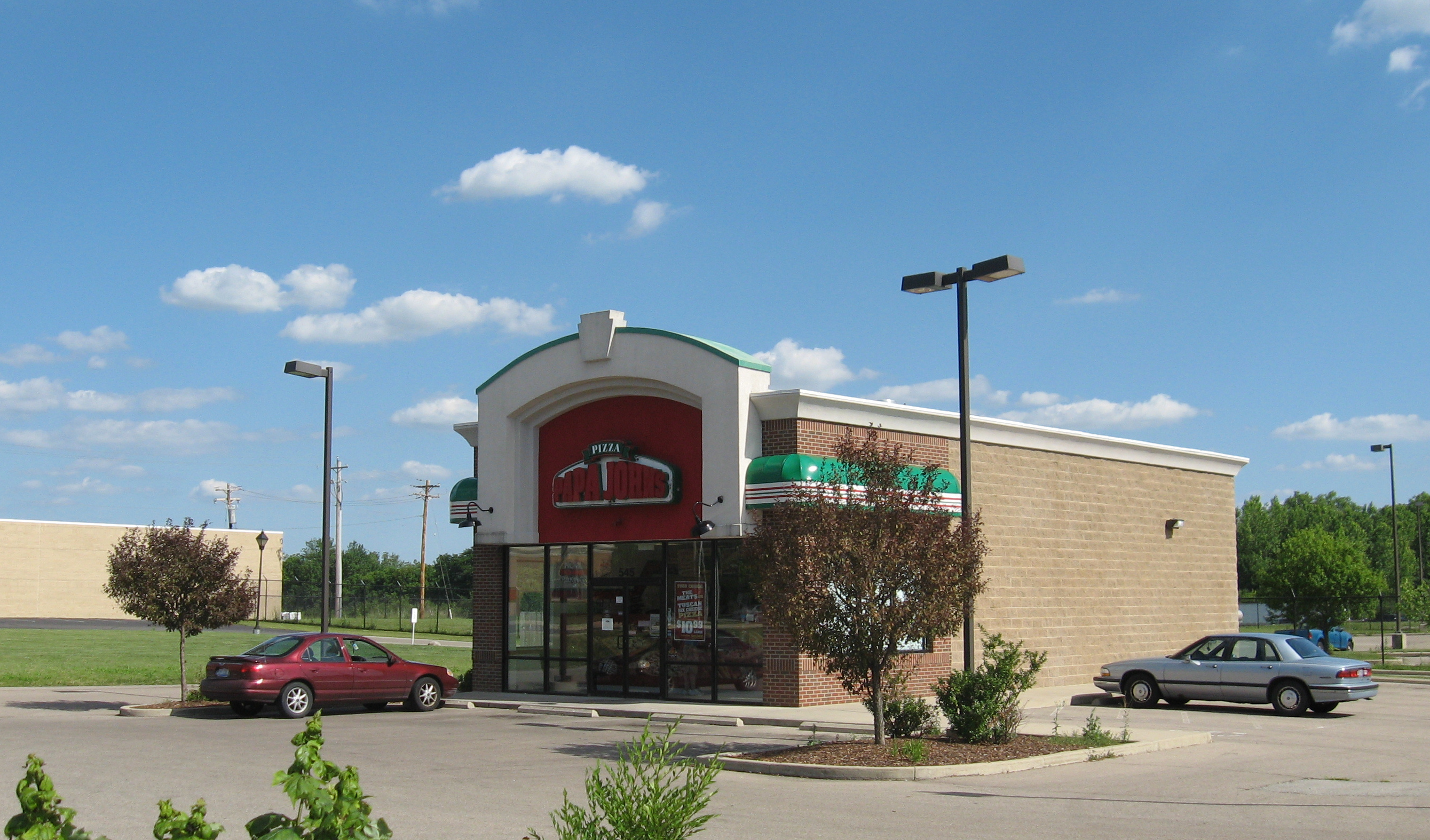
Papa John's in Springboro, Ohio, built specifically for home delivery

Franchise owners pay a one-off franchise fee of US$25,000 per restaurant, then a royalty fee of 5% of net sales, plus a charge for advertising of 8% of net sales. The company requires franchisees to have net worth of at least $250,000, the approximate amount of investment needed.

Based on 2019 sales information provided by Technomic, PMQ Pizza Magazine reported that the company was the fourth-largest take-out and pizza delivery restaurant chain in the United States. (According to PMQ, Little Caesars is the third-largest pizza chain.) The company's net profitability though, is far behind its main competitors. In 2014, its net margin was 4.6% of total sales, whereas Domino's Pizza's net margin was 8.2% and Yum! Brands, which owns Pizza Hut, was 7.9%. Its slogan is "Better Ingredients. Better Pizza. Papa John's."

As of February 2026 Papa Johns had about 6,000 establishments in about 50 countries and territories, with 3,500 in the United States. In January 2002, Papa John's became the first national pizza chain to make online ordering available to all of its U.S. customers. On July 10, 2004, Papa John's controlled an estimated 6.6% of the market, according to Technomic.

== Locations ==
Papa John's locations in the world as of May 2025

=== Africa ===
Papa John's operates in Egypt, Morocco, and Tunisia.

=== Asia ===
Papa John's entered the Indian market in 2006 with its first store opening in Noida, Uttar Pradesh with an aim to open up 100 stores in India. They couldn't keep up the efficient sophisticated ordering technology and fast delivery methods of their rivals Domino's Pizza and Pizza Hut in India. When Papa John's started in 2006, Domino's Pizza already had 126 branches. By 2017, Papa John's decided to exit the country completely, having opened only 66 stores and being unable to compete with Domino's Pizza and Pizza Hut, which had entered in the mid-1990s.

In 2003, Papa John's opened its first branch in Apgujeong-dong, Gangnam-gu, Seoul, South Korea and the second branch in Garak-dong, Songpa-gu, Seoul, South Korea. Compared to Domino's Pizza and Pizza Hut, which started business in Korea in the 1980s, Papa John's started business late in Korea. In 2006, they opened the 50th restaurant in Seoul. As of the end of 2025, Papa John's has a total of 278 stores in Korea. In other countries, Papa John's has menus which are localized to each country. However, in Korea, Papa John's is selling the original American pizzas with special Korean localized pizzas together. Papa John's also has various side menus such as spaghetti in Korea.

In 2009, Papa John's first entered the Malaysian market with its flagship store at Berjaya Times Square in late 2008 / early 2009. It expanded to 23 stores by late 2013 and peaked around 26 stores before facing stiff competition from dominant chains like Domino's and Pizza Hut. By end 2016 Papa John's Pizza exited from Malaysia.

In 2016, Papa John's entered the Israeli market. By 2026 it had grown to 42 local branches.

In 2018, Papa John's sold ownership of its 34 corporate-owned locations in Beijing, shutting down their operations in China.

Papa John's opened its first store in Lahore, Pakistan in early 2019.

=== Europe ===
Papa John's has operated in the United Kingdom since 1999. In July 2015, the company had 300 shops in the UK, although in 2010 it had plans for the number rising to between 400 and 500 within the next five years. In 2023, Papa Johns had plans to open a new takeaway store in Newcastle turned down by the Planning Inspectorate, making it the first organisation in the United Kingdom to have a planning appeal rejected by the Department for Levelling Up, Housing and Communities on the grounds that to grant permission to open a new takeaway store in the area would "undermine local authority plans to tackle high local levels of obesity".

In March 2024, Papa John's announced it would close 43 "underperforming" stores – almost a tenth of its 450 units in the UK.

Papa John's operates throughout Ireland, with its head office at Ballybrit, County Galway. The company has over 50 locations and operates mobile units around the country. The franchises are often located adjacent to Supermac's fast food outlets, whose parent company owns the exclusive franchise rights for the chain in Ireland.

Spain is the second most important European market for Papa John's. The chain has been operating in Spain since 2016, and had 42 restaurants by late 2017. In particular, the restaurants achieved a significant presence in the Madrid province with more than half of the Spanish restaurants being located there. Papa John's expects to open at least 100 restaurants just in the province of Madrid, as well as expanding to other regions across Spain.

Papa John's also operated in Russia and Belarus with plans to expand to several other European and Central Asian countries.

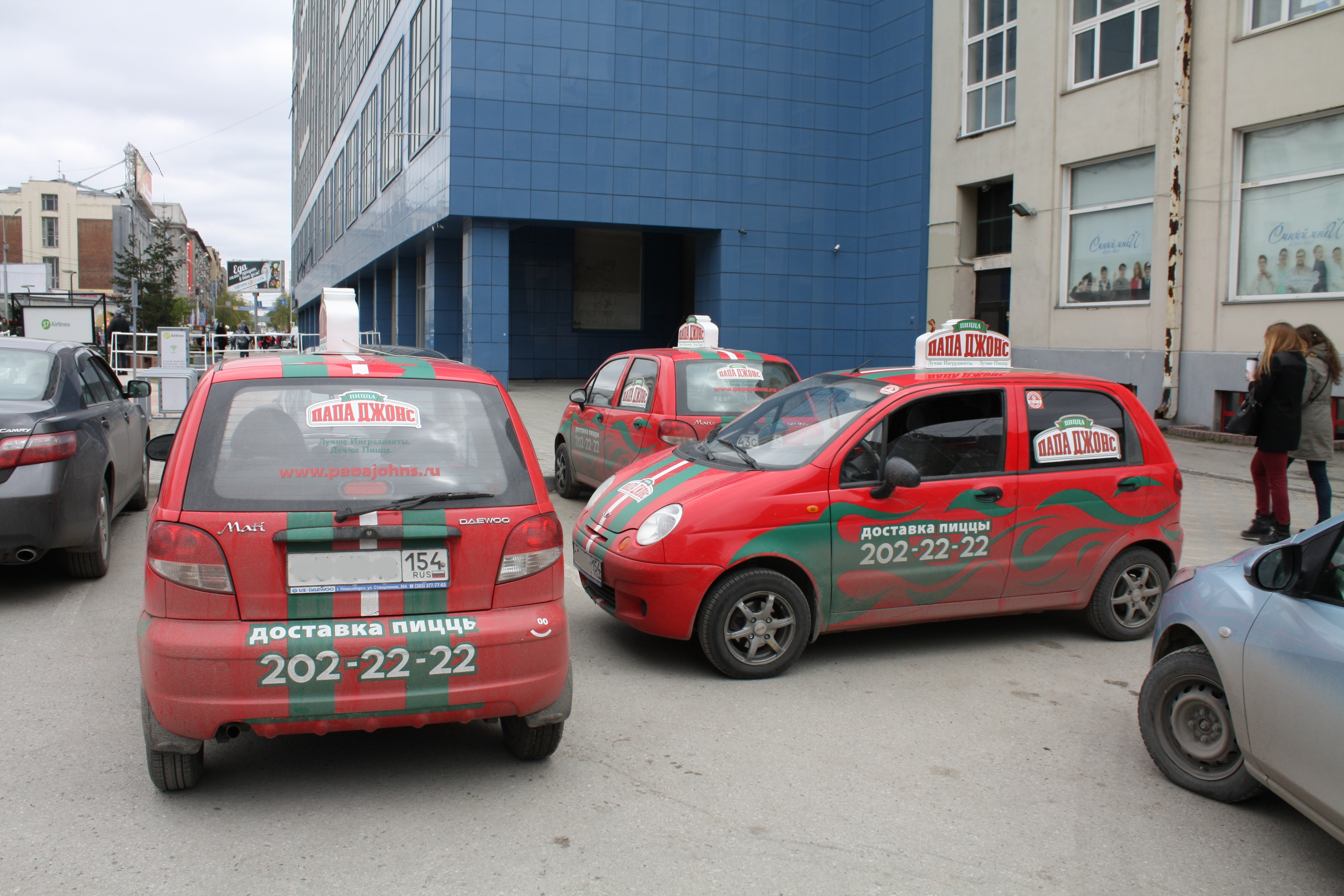
Papa John's delivery cars in Novosibirsk, Russia in 2016

Papa John's restaurants in Portugal began operating in 2005 but closed some time later.

In Poland, Papa John's opened their first location in 2017.

In 2018, Papa John's opened their first restaurant in Kazakhstan, which became the 46th country in the world where the chain is represented.

In May 2019, it was announced that Papa John's would enter the German market by taking over Halle/Salle-based Uno Pizza and converting their stores into Papa John's, with the aim of opening up to 250 locations in Germany in the following five to seven years.

After a failed step in the early 2000s, in 2019 Papa John's returned to Portugal with a restaurant in Lisbon and plans to expand to other parts of the country.

In the Netherlands Papa John's opened its doors in 2017, starting in Amsterdam and expanding further through the Netherlands in 2019.

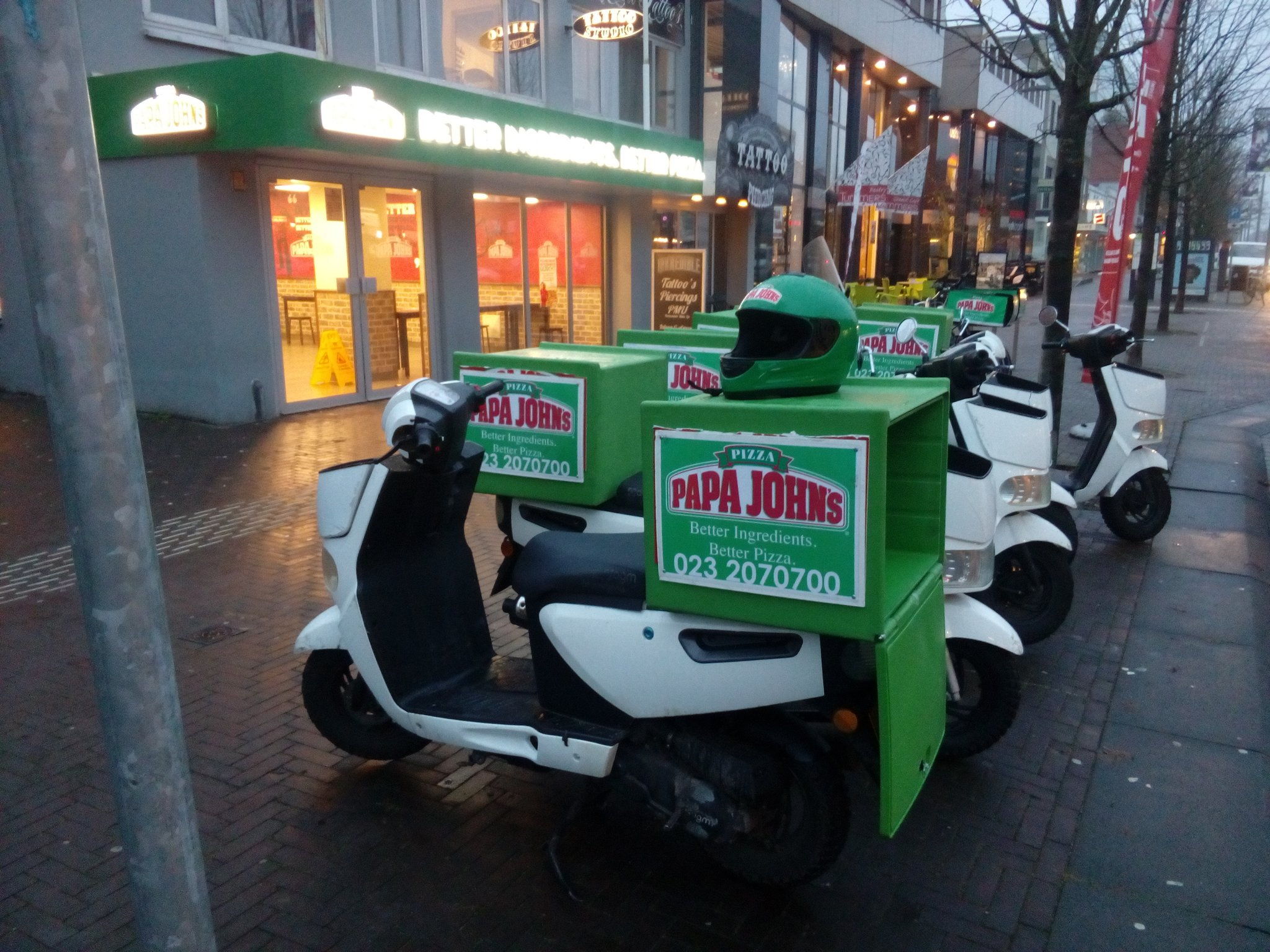
A Papa John's Pizza restaurant in Hoofddorp, Netherlands

=== North America ===
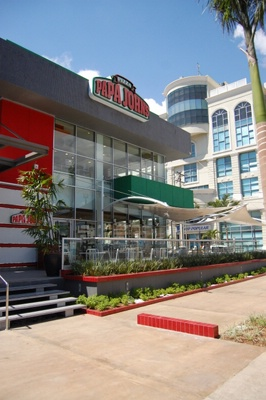
Papa John's in Santo Domingo, Dominican Republic

From Panama to Canada, Papa John's operates in all continental countries of North America. It also operates in several countries in the Caribbean.

=== South America ===
Papa John's operates in several countries in South America.

== Marketing ==
=== Logo ===
Logo used from 1994 to 2018

Logo used from 2018 to 2019

Logo used from 2019 to 2021

In November 2021, Papa John's rebranded its logo (by removing the apostrophe and simplifying the design) and store locations.

=== Sponsorships ===
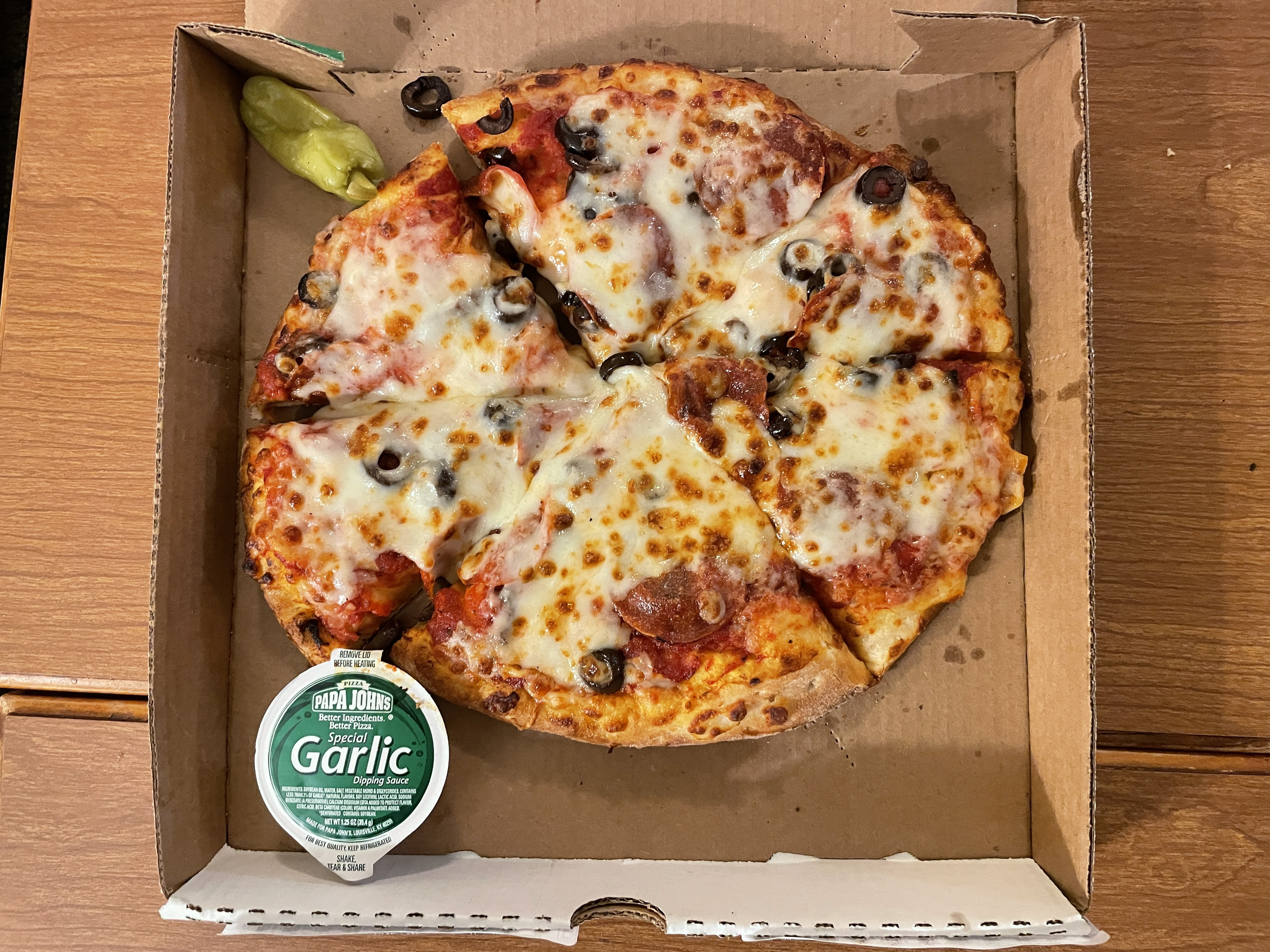
Papa John's pizza with pepperoni and black olives

On March 30, 2006, Six Flags announced that its parks' pizza would exclusively be from Papa John's. In turn, Six Flags received an annual sponsorship and promotional opportunities from Papa John's. Papa John's is also the official pizza supplier of the Olympic Speedskating Oval in Calgary, Alberta, Canada.

In November 2006, Papa John's signed with ESPN Regional Television to become the title sponsor of the annual PapaJohns.com Bowl, a college post-season football bowl game in Birmingham, Alabama, which Papa John's continued to sponsor through 2010.

In 2010, Papa John's signed an agreement to be the Official Pizza Sponsor of the National Football League and Super Bowls XLV, XLVI and XLVII. In 2011, Papa John's became the official Pizza Sponsor of the NFL in Canada, Mexico and the United Kingdom. In October 2012, Denver Broncos quarterback Peyton Manning became a franchisee in the Denver area for Papa John's, and also purchased 21 franchises in the area. In July 2013, Papa John's announced it had become the Official Pizza Partner of The Football League in the UK. The sponsorship ended after the 2017 season when Pizza Hut became the official pizza of the NFL in February 2018.

The company was the former beneficiary of the naming rights to Papa John's Cardinal Stadium used by the University of Louisville's football team, in exchange for Schnatter personally donating $5 million for the rights. Schnatter made a further $10 million donation for the stadium's expansion, and extended the naming rights to the year 2040. The Papa John's name was taken off the stadium in July 2018, after Schnatter's resignation from the company.

In 2020, Papa John's became the main sponsor of the EFL Trophy, a football competition for lower league and under-23 clubs in England.

=== Events ===
In May 2008, a Washington, D.C. franchise distributed T-shirts making fun of Cleveland Cavaliers star player LeBron James during a playoff game against the Washington Wizards. Photographs of the shirts quickly spread online and were later shown on Cleveland television. Increasing awareness of the controversy prompted an apology from the Papa John's national headquarters on May 5. To apologize, Papa John's offered large single-topping pizzas for 23 cents (matching James' jersey number) at all locations in Greater Cleveland and throughout northern Ohio. The chain sold over 172,000 pizzas at 23 cents a piece, with customers waiting in lines outside of some stores for as long as three hours.

In March 2019, NBA Hall of Famer Shaquille O'Neal joined Papa John's board of directors and became a spokesman for the brand. The next year, Papa John's introduced the Shaq-a-Roni, a pizza dedicated to O'Neal.

== Litigation ==
In 1997, Pizza Hut filed a lawsuit against Papa John's based on a series of advertisements that compared the ingredients of Papa John's and its competitors. Pizza Hut successfully argued that Papa John's slogan did not constitute statements of literal fact – that "fresher ingredients" do not necessarily account for a "better" pizza. This ruling was overturned in 2000 when Papa John's appealed the decision. Although the jury's decision on misleading advertising was upheld, the appeals court determined that Pizza Hut failed to prove, under the requirements of the Lanham Act, that the misleading advertising and puffery had a material effect on consumers' purchasing decisions.

In 2012, customers filed a class-action lawsuit alleging that Papa John's had sent more than 500,000 unsolicited text messages. The company settled the lawsuit for $16.5 million, awarding claimants up to $50 in damages, and a free, large, one-topping pizza.

In August 2015, Papa John's agreed to pay $12.3 million to settle a class-action lawsuit in which the company was accused of undercompensating 19,000 delivery drivers in the states of Arizona, Florida, Illinois, Maryland, Missouri and North Carolina. The complaint stated that the flat reimbursement amount per delivery for drivers failed to equal minimum wage.

== Animal welfare ==
From 2013 to 2020, Papa John made commitments concerning gestation crates, cage-free eggs, and broiler-chicken welfare, but animal protection organizations have criticized its progress toward meeting those commitments.

== See also ==
- Cardinal Stadium – a football stadium on the campus of the University of Louisville formerly bearing the company's name via a naming rights agreement
- List of pizza chains
- List of pizza chains of the United States
- List of pizza franchises
- List of pizza varieties by country
- List of major employers in Louisville, Kentucky
- List of the largest fast food restaurant chains
