= John Schnatter =

American entrepreneur, founder of Papa John's

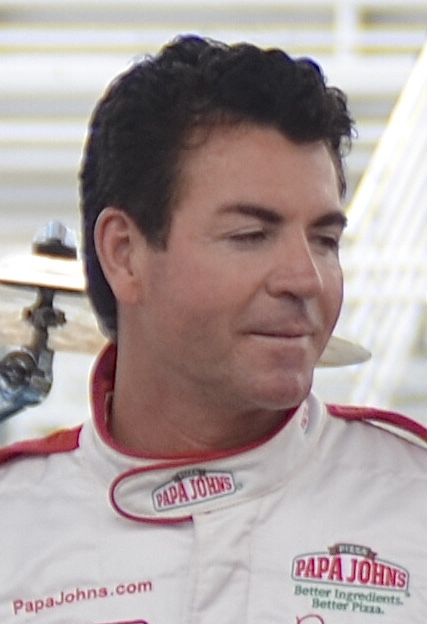
- Schnatter at Charlotte Motor Speedway in 2013
- Born: John Hampton Schnatter; November 22, 1961 (age 64); Jeffersonville, Indiana, U.S.
- Other name: Papa John
- Education: Ball State University
- Occupations: Founder, former CEO, and Chairman of Papa John's Pizza
- Years active: 1984–2018
- Political party: Republican
- Spouse: Annette Cox (m. 1987; div. 2019)
- Children: 3

John Hampton "Papa John" Schnatter (born November 22, 1961) is an American entrepreneur who founded the Papa John's pizza restaurant chain in 1984. Schnatter started the business in the back of his father's tavern after selling his car and using the proceeds to purchase used restaurant equipment. As of 2017, his net worth was more than $1 billion.

Schnatter stepped down as CEO on January 1, 2018, after controversy around his comments that the National Football League (NFL), who had a business affiliation with Papa John's, had not done enough to stop national anthem protests by NFL players, and that the protests had hurt his business. Before he stepped down, his comments had resulted in the NFL cancelling its association with Papa John's.

After stepping down as CEO, Schnatter remained the chairman of the board of directors until July 2018, when controversy had arisen as it was revealed that he had used a racial slur during an internal sensitivity training conference call in May of the same year, claiming without evidence that Colonel Sanders had used the same word without backlash. Schnatter resigned when the comment became public, but has since maintained that the board conspired against him and unfairly forced him out of his position.

== Early life and education ==
Schnatter was born in Jeffersonville, Indiana, in 1961, to Mary and Robert Schnatter. His mother was a real estate agent and his father was a judge in Jeffersonville. He has German ancestry. He graduated from Jeffersonville High School in 1980 and received a business degree from Ball State University in 1983.

In the 1980s, Robert Schnatter co-owned Mick's Lounge, a Jeffersonville tavern.

== Career ==
=== Founding and growth of Papa John's Pizza ===
Schnatter founded Papa John's Pizza in 1984, when he converted a broom closet in the back of his father's tavern. Schnatter sold his 1971 Z28 Camaro to purchase $1,600 worth of used pizza equipment and began selling pizzas to the tavern's customers. His pizzas proved sufficiently popular that a year later he moved into an adjoining space. The company went public in 1993. A year later it had 500 stores, and by 1997 it had opened 1,500 stores. In 2009, Schnatter reacquired the Camaro after offering a reward of $250,000 for it.

Schnatter moved his company headquarters from Jeffersonville, Indiana, to Louisville, Kentucky, in the late 1990s.

In early 2005, Schnatter stepped down as president and CEO of Papa John's, but remained chairman of the board. He returned as CEO in 2008 and briefly had a co-CEO in 2010.

=== Ousting from Papa John's Pizza ===
In October 2017, in a conference call with investors, Schnatter blamed the National Football League for poor financial performance, saying, "The NFL has hurt us ... We are disappointed the NFL and its leadership did not resolve this", referring to the U.S. national anthem protests by football players. Papa John's Pizza had a marketing agreement to be the NFL's "official pizza company" and also had marketing deals with 23 of its 32 teams, and Schnatter said the protests were hurting the company's sales. Later that day, Papa John's announced that the NFL shield or "official sponsor" designation on Papa John's commercials and advertising would be removed.

On December 21, 2017, Schnatter announced that he would step down as CEO of Papa John's amid controversy over his comments. He was replaced as Chief Executive Officer by Chief Operating Officer Steve Richie, effective January 1, 2018. The company said Schnatter would still appear in the chain's commercials and on its pizza boxes, and was the company's biggest shareholder with approximately 9.5 million shares. He remained chairman of the company's board of directors at the time.

In July 2018, Schnatter was reported to have participated in an internal training conference call in May with marketing consultants in which there was a role-playing exercise to help Schnatter avoid making remarks that could cause public controversy and damage the company's reputation. During the conference call, Schnatter said, "Colonel Sanders called blacks niggers and Sanders never faced public outcry". After the call, the marketing agency's owner moved to end its contract with Papa John's. Schnatter resigned as chairman of the board the same day the incident was reported. Later that day, he also stepped down from the University of Louisville (UofL) board of trustees. On July 13, UofL renamed their football stadium from Papa John's Cardinal Stadium to Cardinal Stadium in the wake of the controversy.

On July 26, 2018, Schnatter filed a lawsuit in Delaware against Papa John's Pizza to give him access to the company's books and records; the company did not allow him to access its business records after he resigned in the wake of the teleconference call scandal. He described the company's procedures as an "unexplained and heavy-handed way" to cut ties between him and the company. In addition to preventing him from accessing information, the corporation also implemented a "poison pill" strategy to limit Schnatter's chances of buying back a majority stake in the company. Schnatter also filed a lawsuit against the company in Kentucky in a dispute over property ownership.

In January 2019, a judge ordered the company to give Schnatter access to its records relating to his ouster. A settlement of the lawsuits was announced on March 5, 2019. Under the agreement, the company agreed to share all of its records with Schnatter and to remove a part of its "poison pill" plan that restricted his communication with other shareholders, and Schnatter agreed that he would not seek to stay on the company's board of directors after his term expired on April 30, 2019, and that if a mutually agreeable independent director was chosen to replace him, he would step down before the end of his term. Schnatter retained the right to sue if the records showed wrongdoing by the company. The company also agreed to remove a requirement that the activist hedge fund Starboard Value, which owns about 10% of the company, had to vote in favor of the incumbent board. As of March 2019, Schnatter remained the owner of 31% of the company's shares, but by May 23, he had sold 3.8 million shares and reduced his stake in the company to 19%. By November 2019, his stake was under 17%.

In June 2019, the company was the fourth-largest take-out and pizza delivery restaurant chain in the world, with headquarters in Jeffersontown, Kentucky, part of the Louisville metropolitan area.

In November 2019, Schnatter made his first public comments after leaving Papa John's to Louisville Fox affiliate WDRB. In the interview, he admitted he had used the word "nigger" during an internal conference call on diversity training, but said he did so to convey his hatred of racism and was quoting Colonel Sanders. Schnatter said, "I've had over 40 pizzas in the last 30 days, and it's not the same pizza. It's not the same product. It just doesn't taste as good." He warned that "the day of reckoning will come". The interview subsequently went viral, with numerous parodies appearing online.

In an interview three months later, Schnatter said he had not actually eaten over 40 pizzas in 30 days. Instead, he had tasted over 40 pizzas during that time, as a quality inspection activity. Schnatter also criticized the way the company had been run immediately after his departure by Steve Ritchie, who was described as his former protégé. Ritchie had replaced him as CEO, but had been dismissed after less than a year, and Schnatter said he saw more common ground with Jeff Smith, who became chairman of the board in February 2019. "The one thing he and I agree on is that Steve Ritchie is not a CEO," Schnatter said.

=== Other ventures ===
In 1996, Schnatter started a Louisville-based real estate company called Evergreen Real Estate. The company owns a number of historic properties in Schnatter's home community of Anchorage, Kentucky.

Schnatter launched a business called Calistoga Artisan Sandwiches in 2007. In 2008, he made a million-dollar contribution to the Louisville Zoo's Glacier Run expansion in exchange for Calistoga having naming rights to an adjacent water park. The Calistoga business was mostly shut down in 2012, although three locations continued to operate in Naples, Florida.

In response to the unhealthiness of processed foods and the rise of commercial farms, Schnatter announced the creation of Papa Farms at the Conservative Political Action Conference in 2022. The farm plans to grow crops without GMOs, pesticides and fertilizer.

== Personal life ==
In 1983, Schnatter sold his 1971 Chevrolet Camaro to help his father's struggling business. He used the leftover funds to start Papa John's. Decades later, he offered a reward of $250,000 for the car, and on August 26, 2009, he bought it back for $250,000. The family he sold it to had sold it, but he still paid them a $25,000 finders' fee. In celebration, Papa John's offered a free pizza to anyone who owned a Camaro. Schnatter's original Camaro has been on display in the company's headquarters in Louisville. The company owns several replicas that are used on tours and for public and TV appearances. On August 15, 2015, Schnatter's original Camaro was stolen along with two other classic cars in Detroit, where they were slated to appear in the city's annual Woodward Dream Cruise. The Camaro was recovered two days later on the city's west side with minimal damage.

Schnatter married Annette Cox in 1987. The couple lived in Anchorage, Kentucky, and had three children. Cox filed for divorce on December 5, 2019, and said they had been separated for eight months.

=== Allegations of stalking and sexual misconduct ===
In 1999, Schnatter was accused of stalking and groping a woman. He claimed the woman was trying to extort him for $5 million. The situation ended with a confidential settlement.

In 2009, Schnatter was accused of sexual misconduct involving a 24-year-old female marketing employee, resulting in a confidential settlement.

=== Politics ===
In 2012, Papa John's and Schnatter received media attention after he made critical comments about the Affordable Care Act to a class on entrepreneurship. In a shareholder conference call, Schnatter said that he opposed the ACA because "our best estimate is that the Obamacare will cost 11 to 14 cents per pizza" (equivalent to about $0.15–0.2 in 2025).

Schnatter hosted a fundraiser at his home for Republican presidential nominee Mitt Romney in May 2012. Schnatter also contributed to Donald Trump's 2016 presidential campaign and made supportive comments about his administration in January 2017.

Schnatter spoke at the Conservative Political Action Conference in 2022, attacking cancel culture and President Joe Biden's small business policies. He also pushed a conspiracy theory that Biden created the 2021–2022 Russo-Ukrainian crisis to serve as "a great distraction from all the real issues here that affect Americans."

=== Charitable contributions ===
In December 2015, Schnatter's charitable foundation donated $8 million to the University of Kentucky's Gatton College of Business and Economics to establish a research and teaching institute.

On September 4, 2019, Schnatter's foundation donated $1 million to Simmons College, a historically black college in Kentucky. Simmons College President Kevin Cosby expressed the opinion in a press conference that Schnatter's actions should speak louder than his words, saying "The Black community has heard far too many false words, but today this action—his generosity specifically for Black education and uplift—speaks louder." There was some criticism of the donation offer. Gerome Sutton, a Simmons graduate and member of its board of trustees, said, "It doesn't take a rocket scientist to figure out what's going on. [Schnatter] is trying to pay off the black community with 30 pieces of silver."

In October 2019, the foundation also donated $500,000 to Jeffersonville High School, for renovation of its baseball field, where he had played on the team while a student there. The baseball field was renamed the John H. Schnatter Stadium.

== Awards and honors ==
- Named 1998 National Ernst & Young Retail/Consumer Entrepreneur of The Year.
- Named one of the Ten Outstanding Young Americans in 2000 by the National Jaycees Organization.
- Inducted into the Junior Achievement U.S. Business Hall of Fame in 2007.
- In May 2009 Schnatter was named honorary chair of the Ride to Conquer Cancer benefiting Louisville's Norton Cancer Institute.
- Inducted into the Kentucky Entrepreneur Hall of Fame in 2010.
- In 2012, he became an honorary initiate of Alpha Tau Omega.
