= William H. Meckling =

American financial economist (1921–1998)

- Born: September 20, 1921; McKeesport, PA
- Died: May 15, 1998 (aged 76); Rancho Santa Fe, CA
- Spouse: Rebecca Frances Ely
- Children: 5

Academic background
- Education: Westminster College (Pennsylvania) (B.A.), University of Denver (M.B.A.)

Academic work
- School or tradition: Chicago School
- Institutions: University of Rochester

William "Bill" Henry Meckling II (September 20, 1921 – May 15, 1998) was an American finance professor. Along with Michael Jensen, he published a seminal corporate finance article in 1976 on the "Theory of The Firm". This article is one of the most highly cited articles published in the last fifty years in economics and finance.

== Early life and education ==
Meckling was born in McKeesport, Pennsylvania, a suburb of Pittsburgh, to William Henry Meckling Sr. and Katherine Elizabeth Meckling. The second of six children, he spent time in various cities across Pennsylvania and Indiana before attending Westminster College (Pennsylvania) in 1938. While there, he studied business and was a member of Kappa Phi Lambda. After graduation, Meckling joined the Army Air Corp as a private and concluded the war in 1945 as a sergeant.

Following the war, he married Rebecca Frances Ely. The couple moved to Denver to be with Rebecca's mother where Meckling enrolled at the University of Denver, receiving his MBA in 1947. Meckling took a position teaching and conducting post-graduate research at the university following graduation. In 1949, Meckling enrolled at the University of Chicago studying under Milton Friedman and various members of the Cowles Commission, but did not receive a PhD. Ultimately, choosing to leave his studies and join the RAND Corporation as a senior economist in 1952.

Meckling joined RAND at the same time as Armen Alchian where the two developed an immediate friendship. At RAND, Meckling frequently collaborated with Alchian, Ronald Coase, Burton Klein, and Andrew Marshall (foreign policy strategist). His primary focus was on incentives, economic policy related to military research and development and public policy concerns related to communications satellites.

It was during his time at RAND that Meckling would also join the Mont Pelerin Society. The think tank exposed him to the most influential Neoliberal economics

== Career ==
=== University of Rochester ===
In 1962, a fellow Mont Perlin Society member and University of Chicago alumni, W. Allen Wallis, became the dean at the University of Rochester. Wallis invited Meckling to become the Dean of the University of Rochester business school in 1964. The two would go on to build a business school in the Chicago mold, hiring 14 faculty with degrees from what became the Booth School between 1970 and 1995. A contributing factor to this growth was the size of the university endowment at the time: $580 million, giving the school the country's fourth largest endowment in 1970.

He retired from the university in 1983.

=== Research in corporate structure and incentives ===
==== Theory of the Firm (1976) ====
In 1973, Karl Brunner, a European economist on the faculty at Rochester, approached Meckling and Jensen about participating in an economic conference series he organized in Interlaken. Brunner, Meckling and Jensen began to organize a paper around Milton Friedman's recently published "The Social Responsibility Of Business Is to Increase Its Profits" opinion article in the New York Times. In this article, Friedman posited that the objective of firm managers should be to maximize shareholder value, but did not address whether managers had the right incentives to do so.

Jensen and Meckling would spend the next year refining the paper as they found holes in the view of a firm as a profit-maximizing entity. They did not question whether the objective should be profit maximization, they just questioned whether managers had the right incentives to accomplish this goal. They were not the first to focus on this topic, which had been previously addressed by, among others, Adolf Berle and Gardiner Means in their 1932 book The Modern Corporation and Private Property. Jensen and Meckling's analysis, and the justification for their reasoning, led to the paper being well over 100 pages by the time it was completed. Importantly, they analyzed the conditions that would create greater incentives for managers to maximize shareholder value. The pair presented this paper to their colleagues at Rochester before taking it abroad where it was received poorly. As Jensen recalls in a 2013 interview, "[the faculty] hated it... It was not a mild reaction. They accused us of being wrong."

The key ideas in the paper built upon Meckling's observations while working at RAND. Chief among them were the importance of organizational structure and aligning incentives to desired outcomes. The published version of the paper focuses on managerial incentives: if management receives a lower fraction of the value created, managers will put in less effort to maximize firm value. They posited that if top management owns a given amount of equity, if the company reduces the number of shares outstanding by increasing the amount of debt, top management will own a larger fraction of the remaining equity, and thus have incentives to maximize firm value that are better aligned with other shareholders. The paper also posits that investors will understand the effect of incentives, and will be willing to pay more for shares when they expect that management is more inclined to maximize shareholder value.

=== Outside academia ===
In addition to this, he worked as the executive director of President Nixon's "Commission on an All-Volunteer Armed Force", using his connections at the CNA to secure some of the data used in the final report.

== Personal life and legacy ==
Meckling and his wife, Rebecca Frances Ely, had five children. Following his retirement, he moved to California, where he lived until his death in 1998 as a result of heart disease.
