= Fama–DFA Prize =

The Fama–DFA Prize is an annual prize given to authors with the best capital markets and asset pricing research papers published in the Journal of Financial Economics. The award is named after Eugene Fama, who is a co-founding advisory editor of the journal, a financial economist who helped to develop the efficient-market hypothesis and random walk hypothesis in asset pricing, a 2013 Nobel laureate in Economics, a professor of finance at the Booth School of Business at the University of Chicago, and a research director for Dimensional Fund Advisors and the Center for Research in Security Prices. The prize is also named for the investment advisory firm, Dimensional Fund Advisors.

== Details ==
Each year personal and student subscribers to the Journal of Financial Economics vote for the best paper in each of two categories after the journal's editorial office has enumerated all articles and assigned them to either the corporate finance and organizations area or the capital markets and asset pricing areas. Each subscriber may use one vote for each category. Currently the first prize in each category is $5,000 and the second prize is $2,500.

== Winners ==
The following table is a complete list of past first and second-place winners of the Fama–DFA Prize:

Year	Place	Paper	Author(s)
2022	First	Why does the Fed move markets so much?	Carolin Pflueger and Gianluca Rinaldi
2022	Second	The pass-through of uncertainty shocks to households	Marco Di Maggio, Amir Kermani, Rodney Ramcharan, Vincent Yao, and Edison Yu
2021	First	Sustainable investing in equilibrium	Ľuboš Pástor, Robert F. Stambaugh, and Lucian A. Taylor
2021	Second	Robust benchmark design	Darrell Duffie and Piotr Dworczak
2020	First	Shrinking the cross section	Serhiy Kozak, Stefan Nagel, and Shrihari Santosh
2020	Second	Betting against correlation: Testing theories of the low-risk effect	Clifford S. Asness, Andrea Frazzini, Niels Joachim Gormsen, and Lasse H. Pedersen
2019	First	Characteristics are covariances: A unified model of risk and return	Bryan T. Kelly, Seth Pruitt, and Yinan Su
2019	Second	Bubbles for Fama	Robin Greenwood, Andrei Shleifer, and Yang You
2018	First	An intertemporal CAPM with stochastic volatility	John Y. Campbell, Stefano Giglio, Christopher Polk and Robert Turley
2018	Second	Carry	Ralph S.J. Koijen, Tobias J. Moskowitz, Lasse Heje Pedersen and Evert B. Vrugt
2017	First	Information networks: Evidence from illegal insider trading tips	Kenneth R. Ahern
2017	Second	Skill and luck in private equity performance	Arthur G. Korteweg and Morten Sorensen
2016	First	Systemic risk and the macroeconomy: An empirical evaluation	Stefano Giglio, Bryan T. Kelly, and Seth Pruitt
2016	Second	Momentum crashes	Kent D. Daniel and Tobias J. Moskowitz
2015	First	Scale and skill in active management	Lubos Pastor, Robert F. Stambaugh, and Lucian A. Taylor
2015	Second	Juicing the dividend yield: Mutual funds and the demand for dividends	Lawrence E. Harris, Samuel M. Hartzmark, and David H. Solomon
2014	First	"Betting against beta"	Andrea Frazzini and Lasse H. Pedersen
2014	Second	"Limited partner performance and the maturing of the private equity industry"	Berk A. Sensoy, Yingdi Wang, and Michael S. Weisbach
2013	First	"The other side of value: The gross profitability premium"	Robert Novy-Marx
2013	Second	"Anomalies and financial distress"	Doron Avramov, Tarun Chordia, Gergana Jostova, and Alexander Philipov
2013	Second	"Legislating stock prices"	Lauren Cohen, Karl Diether, and Christopher J. Malloy
2012	First	"Is momentum really momentum?"	Robert Novy-Marx
2012	Second	"Friends with money"	Joseph Engelberg, Pengjie Gao, and Christopher A. Parsons
2011	First	"Corporate bond default risk: A 150-year perspective"	Kay Giesecke, Francis A. Longstaff, Stephen Schaefer, and Ilya A. Strebulaev
2011	Second	"Do hedge funds trade on private information? Evidence from syndicated lending"	Nadia Massoud, Debarshi Nandy, Anthony Saunders, and Keke Song
2010	First	"The good news in short interest"	Ekkehart Boehmer, Zsuzsa R. Huszar, and Bradford Jordan
2010	Second	"A skeptical appraisal of asset-pricing tests"	Jonathan Lewellen, Stefan Nagel, and Jay Shanken
2009	First	"Why is PIN priced?"	Jefferson Duarte and Lance Young
2009	Second	"Do liquidity measures measure liquidity?"	Ruslan Y. Goyenko, Craig W. Holden, and Charles A. Trzcinka
2008	First	"Inter-firm linkages and the wealth effects of financial distress along the supply chain"	Michael G. Hertzel, Zhi Li, Micah S. Officer, and Kimberly J. Rodgers
2008	Second	"Venture capital investment cycles: the impact of public markets"	Paul A. Gompers, Anna Kovner, Josh Lerner, and David Scharfstein
2008	Second	"Dumb money: mutual fund flows and the cross-section of stock returns"	Andrea Frazzini and Owen A. Lamont
2007	First	"Laddering in initial public offerings"	Grace Qing Hao
2007	Second	"Does industry-wide distress affect defaulted firms? Evidence from creditor recoveries"	Viral V. Acharya, Sreedhar T. Bharath, and Anand Srinivasan
2007	Second	"Optimism and economic choice"	Manju Puri and David T. Robinson
2006	First	"The conditional CAPM does not explain asset-pricing anomalies"	Jonathan Lewellen and Stefan Nagel
2006	Second	"Was there a Nasdaq bubble in the last 1990s?"	Lubos Pastor and Pietro Veronesi
2006	Second	"The other January effect"	Michael J. Cooper, John J. McConnell, and Alexei V. Ovtcinnikov
2005	First	"Asset pricing with liquidity risk"	Viral V. Acharya and Lasse Heje Pedersen
2005	Second	"The risk and return of venture capital"	John H. Cochrane
2004	First	"Why are foreign firms listed in the U.S. worth more?"	Craig Doidge, G. Andrew Karolyi, and René M. Stulz
2004	Second	"New lists: Fundamentals and survival rates"	Eugene F. Fama and Kenneth R. French
2003	First	"The great reversals: The politics of financial development in the twentieth century"	Raghuram G. Rajan and Luigi Zingales
2003	Second	"A multivariate model of strategic asset allocation"	John Y. Campbell, Yeung Lewis Chan and Luis M. Viceira
2003	Second	"Voting with their feet: Institutional ownership changes around forced CEO turnover"	Robert Parrino, Richard W. Sias and Laura T. Starks
2002	First	"Breadth of ownership and stock returns"	Joseph Chen, Harrison Hong and Jeremy C. Stein
2002	Second	"Mutual fund performance and seemingly unrelated assets"	Lubos Pastor and Robert F. Stambaugh
2001	First	"Following the leader: a study of individual analysts' earnings forecasts"	Rick A. Cooper, Theodore E. Day and Craig M. Lewis
2001	Second	"Forecasting crashes: Trading volume, past returns and conditional skewness in stock prices"	Joseph Chen, Harrison Hong and Jeremy C. Stein
2000	First	"Commonality in liquidity"	Tarun Chordia, Richard Roll and Avanidhar Subrahmanyam
2000	Second	"Herding among security analysts"	Ivo Welch
1999	First	"Bank entry, competition, and the market for corporate securities underwriting"	Amar Gande, Manju Puri and Anthony Saunders
1999	Second	"Predictive regressions"	Robert F. Stambaugh
1998	First	"Market efficiency, long-term returns, and behavioral finance"	Eugene F. Fama
1998	Second	"Alternative factor specifications, security characteristics, and the cross-section of expected stock returns"	Michael J. Brennan, Tarun Chordia and Avanidhar Subrahmanyam
1998	Second	"An empirical analysis of NYSE specialist trading"	Ananth Madhavan and George Sofianos
1997	First	"Detecting long-run abnormal stock returns: The empirical power and specification of test statistics"	Brad M. Barber and John D. Lyon
1997	Second	"Analyzing investments whose histories differ in length"	Robert F. Stambaugh

== See also ==
- List of economics awards
