= Robin Greenwood =

American economist (born 1977)

- Born: 1977 (age 48–49); Belgium

Academic background
- Education: Massachusetts Institute of Technology (B.S.); Harvard Business School (PhD)

Academic work
- Discipline: Financial economics, stock market, financial bubbles
- Institutions: Harvard Business School
- Awards: Jack Treynor Prize

Robin Greenwood (born 1977) is an American economist, and both the George Gund Professor of Finance and Banking and the Anne and James F. Rothenberg Faculty Fellow at Harvard Business School. He was formerly head of the school's finance unit, and chair of the Behavioral Finance and Financial Stability project. He also served on the Financial Advisory Roundtable of the Federal Reserve Bank of New York.

Greenwood is known for his work on behavioral and institutional finance, with a particular focus on "macro-level" market inefficiencies.

== Academia ==
Greenwood received a B.S. in Economics and Mathematics at MIT in 1998, before receiving his Ph.D. from Harvard in Economics in 2003. During his Ph.D., Greenwood spent time as a post-doctoral Fellow at Harvard Business School, before becoming an assistant professor of Business Administration there in 2003. He has remained a member of the school's faculty since, though was a Visiting Fellow at the London School of Economics in 2007, and a Schoen Scholar at Yale University in 2008. Greenwood became a full professor in 2012. He also spent time, between 2018 and 2021, as head of the Finance Unit at Harvard Business School, and was formerly chair of the Business Economics PhD program.

Greenwood was a member of the Financial Advisory Roundtable of the Federal Reserve Bank of New York alongside Viral Acharya, Thomas Philippon, John H. Cochrane, Jeremy C. Stein and others, and served as an editor of The Review of Financial Studies.

== Research ==
=== Expectations and bubbles ===
Greenwood's research focuses primarily on behavioral and institutional finance, with a specific view on macro-level market inefficiencies; notably monetary policy, stock price bubbles, supply and demand in the bond markets, and predictable financial crises. His work on "Bubbles for Fama", which defined a crash as a 40 percent drop within a two-year period and set parameters for the probability of crashes, has been frequently referenced in suggesting that the valuations of Tesla and Bitcoin are bubbles.

Other work includes the role of institutional finance and the 'financialisation' of the economy, as well as private sector impacts on the economy, where a series of articles increased interest in investor expectations. (Note: Greenwood wrote an article on the impact of private sector reliance on short-term debt.) For his work on an extrapolative capital asset pricing model, the Institute for Quantitative Research in Finance awarded him the Jack Treynor Prize in 2014.

=== Behavioral finance & financial stability ===
Greenwood also spent time as the faculty director of the Behavioral Finance and Financial Stability project at Harvard Business School. The project, launched in July 2016, focused on analysing and exploring stability within financial systems. Within it, Greenwood led research on liquidity management within banks, and the nature of modern bank runs. His work also linked growth within the financial sector to being a prelude to crisis; the perspective noted 'that financial instability often follows periods when financial institutions, like investors and policy makers, have underestimated risks'. Greenwood's later work in 'Predictable Financial Crises' concluded 'the combination of rapid credit growth and asset-price gains during the prior three years is associated with a 40 percent probability of entering a financial crisis within the next three years'.

=== Retail investors ===
Greenwood's research has also focused on individual investors, as well as the rise of 'meme stocks' and impact of retail investors in buoying the American market in 2020–21 and research on the impact of COVID-19 on the economy. His research noted that market speculation can flare with the combination of stimulus funds and retail investors. Earlier work, alongside Nicholas Barberis and Andrei Shleifer linked bullishness to frequent extrapolation of results from recent returns, as well as observing the difficulty for individual investors in finding market-beating strategies.

== See also ==
- Greenwood, Robin, and Dimitri Vayanos. "Bond Supply and Excess Bond Returns." (pdf) Review of Financial Studies 27, no. 3 (March 2014): 663–713.
- Greenwood, Robin, and Samuel G. Hanson. "Issuer Quality and Corporate Bond Returns." (pdf) Review of Financial Studies 26, no. 6 (June 2013): 1483–1525.
