= Veronesi =

Veronesi is an Italian surname. Notable people with the surname include:

- Alberto Veronesi (born 1967), Italian conductor
- Fedora Veronesi (1926-2019), Italian basketball player
- Giovanni Veronesi (born 1962), Italian film director, screenwriter and actor
- Gustavo Veronesi (born 1982), Brazilian footballer
- Luigi Veronesi (1908–1998), Italian photographer, painter, scenographer and film director
- Pietro Veronesi, American economist
- Sandro Veronesi (born 1959), Italian writer and journalist
- Umberto Veronesi (1925–2016), Italian physician and politician
