= David G. Booth =

American businessman (born 1946)

- Born: December 2, 1946 (age 79); Lawrence, Kansas, United States
- Education: University of Kansas (BA, MS); University of Chicago (MBA)
- Occupations: Co-founder and chairman, Dimensional Fund Advisors
- Spouse: Suzanne Deal Booth (m. 1998, divorced)
- Children: 2

David Gilbert Booth (born December 2, 1946) is an American businessman, investor, and philanthropist. He is the chairman of Dimensional Fund Advisors, which he co-founded with Rex Sinquefield.

== Early life and education ==
Booth was born in Lawrence, Kansas. He attended and graduated from Lawrence High School.

Booth received a Bachelor of Arts with a major in economics in 1968 and a Master of Science in business in 1969 from the University of Kansas. He then enrolled at the University of Chicago Graduate School of Business in 1969 as a doctoral student, leaving in 1971 with an MBA degree. He was a research assistant to Eugene Fama, and he met his future business partner, Rex Sinquefield, at the University of Chicago Graduate School of Business.

He has published research articles including “Diversification Returns and Asset Contributions” with Eugene Fama. The article won the 1992 Graham and Dodd Award of Excellence from the Financial Analysts Journal.

== Career ==
After Booth left graduate school in Chicago, he helped create one of the world's first index funds in the 1970s as part of a team at Wells Fargo led by John “Mac” McQuown. He then launched the first passively managed small company strategy after founding Dimensional in 1981. Under Booth's leadership, Dimensional grew from a small business operating out of the spare room of his Brooklyn brownstone apartment to a global investment manager with more than 1,500 employees and around $800 billion in assets under management. Booth led Dimensional as CEO and later Co-CEO until 2017, when he stepped back from the daily management of the firm. He remains closely involved in strategic initiatives at Dimensional as chairman.

Booth has spent his career applying groundbreaking financial theory and research to the world of asset management. His investment approach with Dimensional is based on the application of the efficient market hypothesis, and he helped pioneer what would later be called factor investing, targeting areas of the market that research shows have higher expected returns. Dimensional's researchers and academics seek to develop investment strategies that will outperform index funds.

Booth has served on institutional boards, including the Becker Friedman Institute Advisory Board and the Hoover Institution Board of Overseers; as a trustee of New York's Museum of Modern Art, where he also serves on the executive committee; as a trustee emeritus of the University of Chicago; and as a life trustee of the University of Kansas Endowment Association.

According to Forbes, he had a net worth of $2 billion in August 2021.

== Philanthropy ==
An avid art collector and sports enthusiast, as well as a supporter of academia, Booth has participated in and donated to academic, artistic and athletic initiatives across the US. Booth has focused his philanthropy efforts on educational institutions and art restoration projects.

In 1999, Booth gave $10 million for construction of the Charles M. Harper Center building on the University of Chicago campus. Booth pledged $300 million in November 2008 to name the University of Chicago Graduate School of Business after him. He is a trustee emeritus of the university. The gift is for the school's publications, international presence, research centers, and faculty professional development.

Booth has advocated for the role sports play in keeping alumni connected to a school. Booth gave $9 million to the University of Kansas in 2004 to fund the Booth Family Hall of Athletics attached to Allen Fieldhouse. In September 2017, Booth announced a donation of over $50 million to renovate and rename the University of Kansas football team stadium as the David Booth Kansas Memorial Stadium.

In 2010, Booth bought Dr. James Naismith's original 1891 copy of the 13 basic rules of basketball at auction for $3.8 million (a total of $4,338,500 for the rules, auction house fees, and buyer's premium). He then donated the rules to the University of Kansas. The University of Kansas is called the "Cradle of Basketball" because Naismith and his protégé Dr. Forrest C. "Phog" Allen, the "Father of Basketball Coaching," coached at KU and helped it mature into a modern sport. The purchase price was a record for sports memorabilia. The event was documented in the 2012 ESPN 30 for 30 film There's No Place Like Home.

The Booth Center for Special Collections at Georgetown's Lauinger Library, which contains documents related to Georgetown as well rare books, manuscripts, and art, was funded by a $3 million donation from Booth in 2014, two years after his daughter graduated from the school.

The David Booth Conservation Center and Department, responsible for the preservation of the Museum of Modern Art collection in New York, and the museum’s Conservation Fellowship Initiative launched in 2018, were made possible through the David Booth Conservation Center Endowment Fund.

In May 2018, Booth signed the Giving Pledge, promising to dedicate half of his wealth to philanthropy. The pledge, created by Warren Buffett, Bill Gates and Melinda French Gates, is a drive for wealthy individuals to commit the majority of their fortunes to charity during their lifetimes or in their wills.

In 2019, Booth pledged $10 million to The University of Texas at Austin to build the Giant Magellan Telescope. for which he was awarded the University of Texas College of Natural Sciences Distinguished Service Award and inducted into the college Hall of Honor.

In 2025, Booth pledged $300 million to his alma mater, The University of Kansas. The gift is the largest in school history and among the largest in the history of college athletics.

== Personal life ==
David G. Booth married Suzanne Deal Booth in 1998, and have later divorced. They have a son, Chandler Booth, and a daughter, Erin Booth.

== Awards and honors ==
- 2022 Museum of Modern Art’s David Rockefeller Award
- 2018 University of Chicago Medal
- 2017 Investment News Icons and Innovators Award
- 2016 Institutional Investor Investment Management Lifetime Achievement Award
- 2016 Forbes Money Masters: The 40 Most Powerful People in the Financial World
- 2012 Financial Management Association International’s Outstanding Financial Executive Award
- 2010 Investment News “The Power 20” in the financial services industry
- 1992 Financial Analysts Journal Graham and Dodd Award of Excellence
