= Weisbach =

Weisbach is a surname. Notable people with the name include:

- Julius Weisbach (1806–1871), German mathematician and engineer
- Michael S. Weisbach, American economist
- Raimund Weisbach (1886–1970), American soldier
- Werner Weisbach (1873–1953), German-Swiss art historian

== See also ==
- Darcy–Weisbach equation
