= Lauren Haynes =

American curator

Lauren Haynes is an American curator who is head curator of Governors Island, in New York City.

Before assuming her current position in 2024, she was director of artist initiatives and curator of contemporary art at the Crystal Bridges Museum of American Art and the Momentary in Arkansas; senior curator of contemporary art at the Nasher Museum of Art; and director of curatorial affairs and programs at the Queens Museum.

== Early life and education ==
Haynes was born in Tennessee, and moved to the Bronx, New York City when she was about twelve years old. She studied at Oberlin College, where she received a bachelor's degree in art history. At Oberlin, she worked at the Allen Memorial Art Museum, which was then directed by American art historian Sharon Patton. Haynes recalled seeing Patton – an African-American woman and scholar in African-American art history – as an inspiration for her to take an art class and eventually study art history.

== Career ==
After graduating, Haynes worked temporary office positions and considered a job in the legal department of a real estate company before she received an offer to become a departmental assistant at the Brooklyn Museum. Less than a year into her work at the Brooklyn Museum she was offered a job at the Studio Museum in Harlem. She joined the Studio Museum in 2006, where she would work for a decade starting as a curatorial assistant and later as associate curator of the museum's permanent collection. She curated dozens of exhibitions both at the Studio Museum and at other institutions in New York City, including shows on the works of Romare Bearden and Carrie Mae Weems at the Studio Museum. Her work on the museum's artist-in-residence program was reported to have "impacted the career trajectories of numerous artists who have gone on to have great successes worldwide."

In 2016, Haynes became curator of contemporary art at the Crystal Bridges Museum of American Art and the curator of visual arts at the Momentary. Exhibitions she has curated at Crystal Bridges include The Beyond: Georgia O'Keeffe and Contemporary Art (2018), Crystals in Art: Ancient to Today (2019), as well as the Focus section of the 2019 Armory Show. She also coordinated the first exhibition of Soul of a Nation: Art in the Age of Black Power (2018) in the United States and led the curatorial team on State of the Art (2020). In 2019, it was announced that Haynes and independent curator Teka Selman would curate the inaugural edition of the Tennessee Triennial for Contemporary Art in 2021; the event was later postponed from its original date to 2023 without Haynes or Selman.

In 2020, Haynes was named director of artist initiatives and curator of contemporary art at Crystal Bridges and the Momentary. In 2021, she was appointed the Patsy R. and Raymond D. Nasher Senior Curator of Contemporary Art at the Nasher Museum of Art at Duke University, then director of Curatorial Affairs and Programs at the Queens Museum in 2022, and then head curator and vice-president for arts and culture at Governors Island in 2024.

== Other activities ==
In 2018, Haynes was a member of the jury that selected Rodney McMillian for the inaugural Suzanne Deal Booth Art Prize.
