= Elizabeth Fama =

American writer

- Born: March 30, 1965 (age 61); Chicago, Illinois, U.S.
- Education: University of Chicago (BA, MBA, PhD)
- Occupation: Author
- Spouse: John H. Cochrane
- Children: 4
- Writing career
- Genres: Young adult books, novels, and short stories
- Notable works: Overboard; Monstrous Beauty; Plus One
- Website: elizabethfama.com

Elizabeth Fama (born March 30, 1965) is an American young adult author, best known for her book Monstrous Beauty (Farrar, Straus and Giroux Books for Young Readers, 2012), a fantasy novel for teens. Her fifth publication was Plus One, which published in April 2014.

== Background ==
Fama attended University of Chicago Laboratory Schools. She has a BA (1985) in biology with honors from the University of Chicago, and an MBA (1991) and PhD (1996) in economics and finance from the University of Chicago Graduate School of Business.

Fama is the daughter of Eugene Fama. She is married to economist John H. Cochrane and, together, they have four children.

== Works ==
- Overboard, Cricket Books, Chicago (2002) ISBN 9780812626520
- Men Who Wish To Drown (e-book), Tor Books, a Tor.Com original, New York (2012) ISBN 9781466827158
- Monstrous Beauty, Farrar Straus Giroux, New York (2012) ISBN 9780374373665
- Noma Girl (e-book), Tor Books, a Tor.Com original, New York (2014) ISBN 9781466866706
- Plus One, Farrar Straus Giroux, New York (2014) ISBN 9780374360078

== Reception ==
Fama's works have generally been well received. Kirkus Reviews wrote about Overboard, "Although some scenes seem implausible, particularly Emily’s ability to carry on complete conversations and sing in her weakened state, first-time author Fama skillfully conveys the impact of survival in human nature" and "Inspired by an actual ferry accident caused by lax safety standards, this is a powerful exploration on the will to live", while Publishers Weekly asserted "Such muddled, cumbersome prose weighs down the chronicle of Emily's nightlong struggle to survive in the sea, heavily reliant upon coincidences."

Kirkus was also positive about Monstrous Beauty writing "Not so much romance as suspense, this stylish fantasy mesmerizes", and while Publishers Weekly called it "a chilling and original story", they also found "The alternating narrative device can make for stutters in the momentum, and there are stretches (notably when genealogy is rehearsed) where the plot trudges." but "The horror and humanity are adroitly handled, however, and Fama never lapses into cliché."

For Plus One, Publishers Weekly noted "Fama smoothly unspools the details of her alternate Earth’s history in conversational flashbacks that never impede the brisk pacing, yet enhance the sense of connection with her very human characters."

== Awards ==
The American Library Association included Monstrous Beauty on its 2013 list of Best Fiction for Young Adults, and it won a silver Odyssey Award for best audiobook produced for children and/or young adults. It was also a 2012 Nerdies Book Award nominee. Fama's first novel, Overboard (Cricket Books, 2002), was for ages 11 and up, and set in Indonesia. It was named a 2003 Best Book for Young Adults by the American Library Association (one of only eleven books selected unanimously by the committee that year), it received the 2002–2003 honor award for children's fiction from the Society of Midland Authors, and it was nominated for five state readers' choice awards (New Hampshire, Texas, Illinois, Utah, and Florida).
