= Richard Roll =

American economist (born 1939)

- Born: October 31, 1939 (age 86)

Academic background
- Influences: Merton Miller

Academic work
- Discipline: Financial economics
- School or tradition: Chicago School
- Website: Information at IDEAS / RePEc

Richard Roll (born October 31, 1939) is an American economist and professor of finance at CalTech, best known for his work on portfolio theory and asset pricing, both theoretical and empirical.

He earned his bachelor's degree in aerospace engineering from Auburn University in 1961, and his M.B.A. in 1963 at the University of Washington while working for Boeing in Seattle, Washington. In 1968, he received his Ph.D. from the Graduate School of Business at the University of Chicago in economics, finance, and statistics. His Ph.D. thesis, "The Behavior of Interest Rates: An Application of the Efficient Market Model to U.S. Treasury Bills," won the Irving Fisher Prize as the best American dissertation in economics in 1968.

Roll co-authored the first event study that sought to analyze how stock prices respond to an event in 1969, using price data from a database from the Center for Research in Security Prices. Roll co-authored major papers with Stephen Ross, Eugene Fama, Michael Jensen and Kenneth French.

Roll took an Assistant Professor position at Carnegie-Mellon University in 1968, a professorship at the European Institute for Advance Studies in Management in 1973, and Centre d'Enseignement Superiéure des Affaires in 1975. In 1976, Roll joined the faculty at UCLA, from which he retired as Japan Alumni Chair Professor of Finance in 2014. In 1987, Roll was elected president of the American Finance Association. Roll has published over 80 professional articles.

In addition to his academic work, Roll has also been active in the money management industry. From 1985-1987, he took a leave of absence from UCLA and worked at Goldman Sachs. In 1985 he also co-founded Roll and Ross Asset Management Corporation with Stephen Ross. Roll was co-chairman until 2005.

== See also ==
- Roll's critique – Validity analysis of the capital asset pricing model
