= Jennifer Packer =

American artist

- Born: 1984 (age 41–42); Philadelphia, PA
- Education: Tyler School of Art; BFA – 2007; Yale University School of Art; MFA – 2012
- Known for: Visual Art
- Awards: Hermitage Greenfield Prize and the Rome Prize

Jennifer Packer (born 1984) is a contemporary American painter and educator based in New York City. Packer's subject matter includes political portraits, interior scenes, and still life featuring contemporary Black American experiences. She paints portraits of contemporaries, funerary flower arrangements, and other subjects through close observation. Primarily working in oil paint, her style uses loose, improvisational brush strokes, and a limited color palette.

External videos
- “Jennifer Packer: The Eye Is Not Satisfied With Seeing”, Whitney Museum of American Art, March 23, 2022

== Early life and education ==
Packer was born and raised in Philadelphia, Pennsylvania. She attended Tyler School of Art at Temple University where she earned her Bachelor of Fine Arts in 2007. In 2012, she graduated from Yale University with a Master of Fine Arts in painting and printmaking.

== Work ==
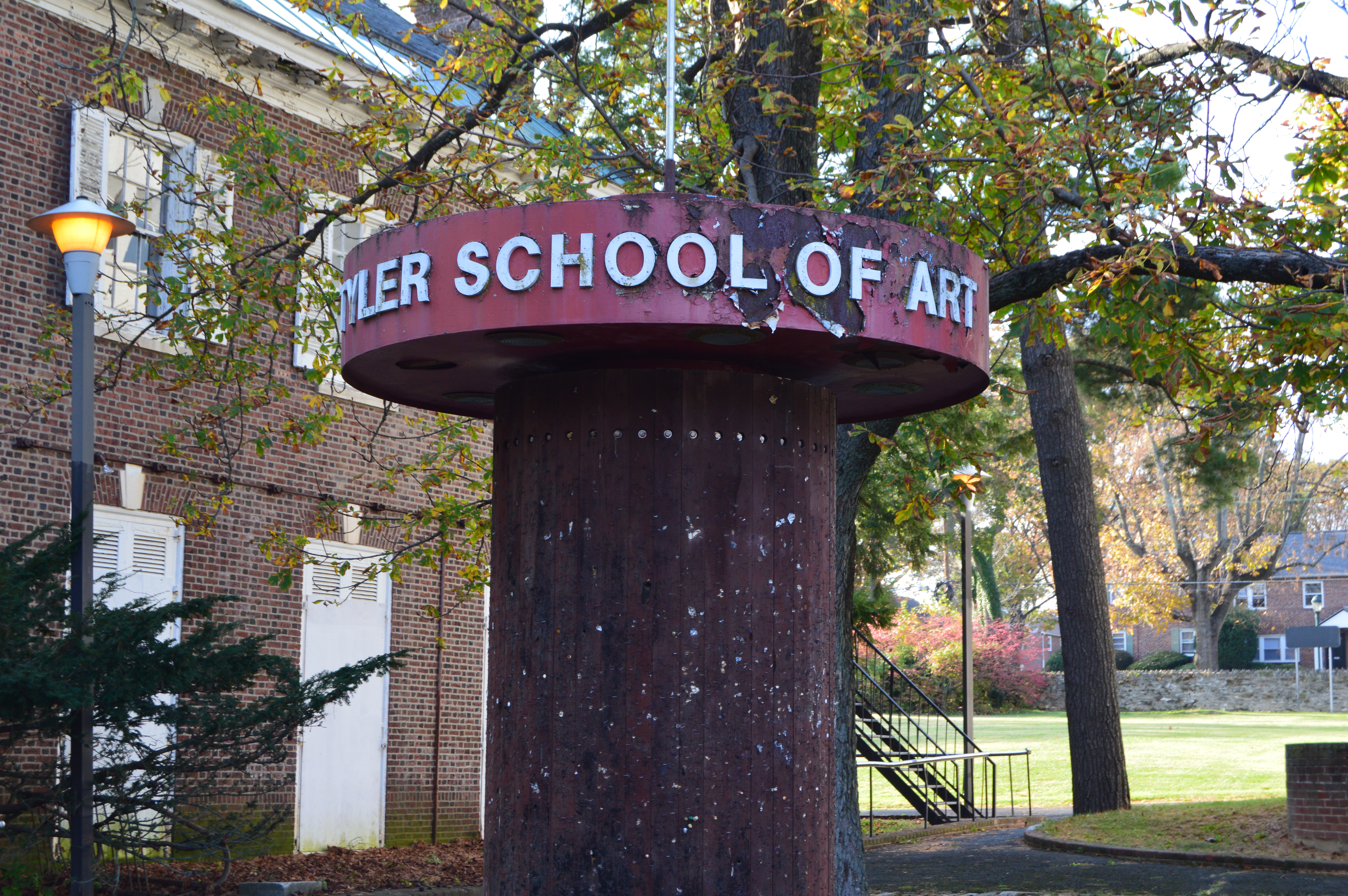
Tyler School of Art and Architecture, Jennifer Packer's first college before going to Yale University.

After completing her MFA, Packer moved to the Bronx, and later became an assistant professor in the painting department at Rhode Island School of Design. She is currently an assistant professor at Cooper Union.

== Themes within art ==
Packer has been inspired by social justice movements, which can be seen through her floral work representing institutional violence against Black Americans and the resulting grief. For her portraits, she depicts friends and family in an intimate style that is meant to avoid a straightforward reading. In 2013, she made art featuring body parts such as fingers, knees, and protruding jaw lines of straining bodies emerging from the haze, an example of which is Lost In Translation. In 2017, Transfiguration (He's No Saint) shows a young African-American man wearing glasses with two raised arms. The majority of his body is rendered dramatically in brilliant yellow, red, and green. This work represents the prevention of a stop and search of a Black man by police. Circular parts on his flesh signify the marks of stigmata. The figure's eyes are half closed, indicating loss of what he is or expects out of the world. The Mind Is Its Own Place (2020) shows a level of depression and complexity of the human mind within her work through a limited palette in a charcoal drawing.

== Settings on art ==
Packer's subjects are African Americans, and her themes center around oneness. Her art is political, recognizing the social discord all people witness or are affected by in this generation. Despite her art not focusing on the entirety of social injustice, it does bring awareness to inequality within the United States. Visually Impaired is one of her early works which expresses realization and abstraction. It intends to resemble Ferdinand Holder's 19th century deathbed art pieces. In some of her 2017 artwork, she aimed to achieve contrast and depth. Say Her Name, a flower oil canvas piece, is another example, created as a growing flower drawn like a forest. According to a video interview, in most of her early works she decides to create a memento, a slight reference in her artwork to a past artist she was either inspired by or had similar real-life goals in art. Packer tends to draw most human figures with realistic details.

== Artistic practice ==
Packer paints expressionist portraits, interior scenes, and still life. She is interested in authenticity, encounters, and exchanges in relation to her painting practice. The models for her portraits are often friends or family members.

In her 2020 exhibition at the Serpentine Gallery in London, her expressionistic paintings were all oils on canvas. Blessed Are Those Who Mourn (Breonna! Breonna!) shows her reaction to the killing of Breonna Taylor. A painting of flowers, a traditional form of still life, was used in Say Her Name to reference the death of Sandra Bland. Other portraits indicate inspiration from western sources as diverse as Henri Matisse and Caravaggio as well as Americans Kerry James Marshall and Philip Guston.

She was included in the 2019 traveling exhibition Young, Gifted, and Black: The Lumpkin-Boccuzzi Family Collection of Contemporary Art.

== Selected exhibitions ==
- Group show, Fore, curated by Lauren Haynes, Naima J. Keith and Thomas J. Lax at The Studio Museum in Harlem, 2012
- Solo exhibition, Treading Water, Corvi-Mora, London, 2015
- Solo exhibition, Jennifer Packer: Tenderheaded, The Renaissance Society, Chicago, 2017; Rose Art Museum, Waltham, 2018
- Solo exhibition at Sikkema Jenkins & Co (2018); Packer exhibited a large diptych titled Laquan, a colorful still life of palm fronds and fiery peonies, named after Laquan McDonald, a Black teenager murdered by a Chicago policeman in 2014
- 2019 Whitney Biennial, curated by Rujeko Hockley and Jane Panetta
- Solo exhibition, Serpentine Gallery, London, 2020
- Solo exhibition, Jennifer Packer: Every Shut Eye Ain’t Sleep, Museum of Contemporary Art, Los Angeles, 2021
- Solo exhibition, Jennifer Packer: The Eye Is Not Satisfied With Seeing, Whitney Museum of American Art, New York City, 2021
- Solo exhibition, Prospect 5: Yesterday we said tomorrow, Ogden Museum of Southern Art, New Orleans, Louisiana, 2021
- Solo exhibition, Jennifer Packer: Dead Letter, Sikkema Malloy Jenkins Gallery, New York, New York, 2025

== Awards and Fellowships ==
In 2013, Packer was awarded the Rema Hort Mann Grant. In 2012–2013, Packer was an Artist-in-Residence at The Studio Museum in Harlem, and from 2014 to 2016, a Visual Arts Fellow at the Fine Arts Work Center in Provincetown, Massachusetts.

In 2020, she won the Hermitage Greenfield Prize, which included a commission to produce a new work that will premiere in 2022 at the John and Mable Ringling Museum of Art in Sarasota, Florida. Packer also won the Rome Prize in 2020 from the American Academy in Rome and was a Rome Prize Fellow from January 11–August 6, 2021.
