= Lubos Pastor =

Slovak-American financial economist (born 1974)

- Ľuboš Pástor
- Born: 19 March 1974 (age 52); Košice, Czechoslovakia
- Citizenship: Slovakia, United States
- Education: Wharton School; Wichita State University; Comenius University in Bratislava
- Known for: Pastor-Stambaugh liquidity factors
- Awards: Smith Breeden Prize; Fama-DFA Prize; Ross Prize; Moskowitz Prize; AQR Insight Award
- Scientific career
- Fields: Financial economics
- Workplaces: University of Chicago Booth School of Business

Lubos Pastor (born 19 March 1974) is a Slovak-American financial economist, Charles P. McQuaid Distinguished Service Professor of Finance and Robert King Steel Faculty Fellow at Booth School of Business, University of Chicago. He earned his Ph.D. in finance from the Wharton School at the University of Pennsylvania.

== Academic work ==
Pastor's research focuses on financial markets and asset management. His most cited paper, “Liquidity risk and expected stock returns”, has been cited over 7,000 times according to Google Scholar. The paper introduces the concept of a liquidity risk factor and constructs the Pastor-Stambaugh liquidity factors. His other work addresses topics such as sustainable investing, political uncertainty, stock price bubbles, technological revolutions, the size of the active management industry, and portfolio choice.

Pastor's research has been awarded numerous best paper prizes including two Smith Breeden Prizes (2003, 2012), four Fama-DFA Prizes (2002, 2006, 2015, 2021), the AQR Insight Award (2021), the Moskowitz Prize (2022), and the Ross Prize (2024).

Since 1 January 2025, he has served as President of the European Finance Association, after serving on its board since 2021. From 2016 to 2019 he was on the board of directors of the American Finance Association. He was on the board of directors of the Western Finance Association from 2010 to 2017 and served as its president from 2016 to 2017.

He is a research associate with the National Bureau of Economic Research (NBER) and a research fellow with the Centre for Economic Policy Research (CEPR). Pastor has served as an associate editor of the Journal of Finance, Journal of Financial Economics, and the Review of Financial Studies.

In 2016, Pastor was awarded an honorary doctorate by the University of Economics in Bratislava.

== Non-academic work ==
In 2015, Pastor was appointed by the Government of the Slovak Republic to the Bank Board of the National Bank of Slovakia. In 2021, he was reappointed to serve on the Board for another term until 2027. On 19 December 2023, Pastor resigned from the board due to increasing work commitments in the United States.

From 2008 to 2012, he co-designed the investable CRSP Indexes in cooperation with the Center for Research in Security Prices and Vanguard. In 2024, he was elected to the Board of Directors of Vanguard.
