= Ilya Strebulaev =

Russian-American economist (born 1975)

Ilya A. Strebulaev
- Илья А. Стребулаев
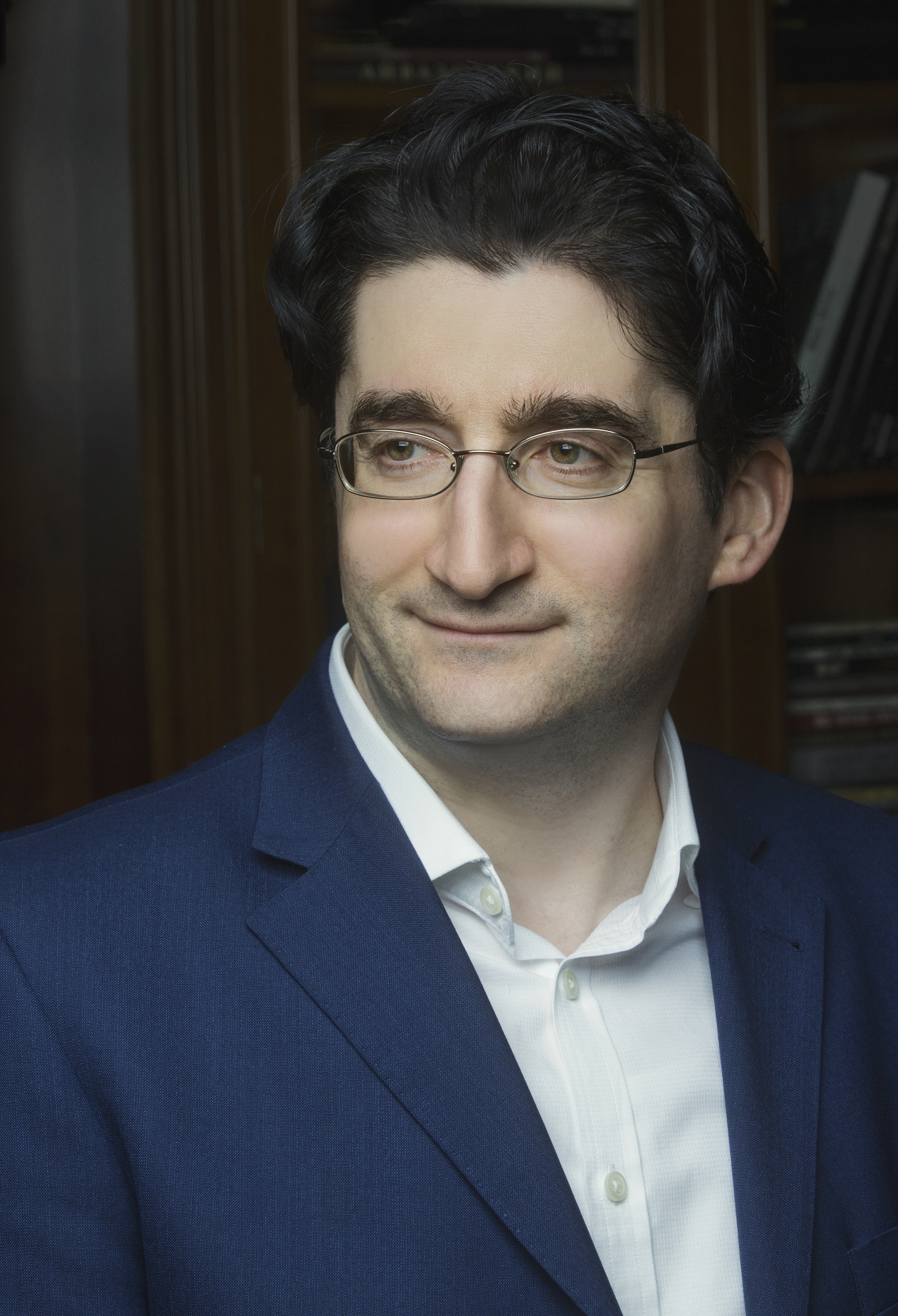
- Strebulaev in 2017
- Born: 17 May 1975 (age 51); Moscow, Russian SFSR, Soviet Union
- Occupation: Professor at Stanford Graduate School of Business

Academic background
- Education: London Business School (PhD); New Economic School (MA); Moscow State University (BA)
- Website: Official website Personal website

Ilya Alekseyevich Strebulaev (Russian: Илья Алексеевич Стребулаев; born 17 May 1975) is a Russian-American financial economist, researcher, author, and speaker with expertise in venture capital, startups, and corporate innovation. He has been a professor at the Stanford Graduate School of Business since 2004. From 2018 to 2022, he was on the board of directors of Yandex, the Russian equivalent of Google.

== Early life and education ==
Strebulaev was born in Moscow, Russia on May 17, 1975, to a family of scientists and engineers. He received a B.A. in economics from Moscow State University and an M.A. in economics at the New Economic School in 1999. He then moved to London, where he pursued his doctoral studies at the London Business School under Stephen Schaefer. His doctoral thesis was on corporate financial decision-making. He received a Ph.D. degree in finance in 2004.

== Career ==
In 2004, Strebulaev moved to Stanford, California, when he was hired by the Stanford University Graduate School of Business as an assistant professor of finance. He received tenure at Stanford University in 2010 and was promoted to full professor in 2014. In 2016, Strebulaev was appointed a chaired professor, becoming the inaugural holder of the David S. Lobel Professorship, the first endowed professorship in private equity at Stanford. Since 2010, he has been a research associate at the National Bureau of Economic Research.

In 2015, Strebulaev founded the Venture Capital Initiative at the Stanford Graduate School of Business, and he has been its faculty director since then.

In 2018, he became a member of the board of directors of Yandex, Russias largest internet and tech company and in March 2022, he resigned from it.

== Personal life ==
Strebulaev is married to Anna Dvornikova; the couple has two children. He holds dual US and Russian citizenship.

== Work ==
Strebulaev developed a framework with Will Gornall that assesses the value of private venture capital (VC) backed companies. Their valuation model is built on the option pricing methodology and takes into account complicated shareholder structures of VC-backed companies. They found that most unicorns (highly valued VC-backed companies) are overvalued, with a median overvaluation of 50%. Strebulaev's research also includes studies on the decision-making of startup investors, the organization and design of VC and corporate VC units, and the importance of venture capital in innovation and the economy. He has shown that the VC industry led to the creation of most large public US companies in the last 50 years and is an important growth engine behind the US innovation economy. His work has been widely published in leading academic journals including The Journal of Finance, The Review of Financial Studies, and The Journal of Financial Economics. Strebulaev has received many awards for his work, including the First Paper Prize of the Brattle Award in the Journal of Finance and The First Place of the Fama-DFA Prize at the Journal of Financial Economics.

He is known for actively sharing his research and teaching insights on LinkedIn and other social media platforms.

=== Teaching ===
Strebulaev has been teaching at MBA, MSx, Ph.D., and Executive Education programs at Stanford. In 2013, Strebulaev developed an MBA-level course on angel and venture capital financing and decision-making, which he has been teaching with famous VCs for the past ten years, with almost 1,000 students taking the class. The class covers many aspects of VC financing, the decision making of startup investors, and startup valuation. Strebulaev also developed a class on the private equity industry in 2021.

In 2009, Strebulaev received the MBA Distinguished Teacher Award at the Stanford Graduate School of Business. He also received the Master's in Management Inaugural Best Teacher Award at the London Business School in 2010 and the Sloan Teaching Excellence Award at the Stanford Graduate School of Business in 2013.

Strebulaev frequently leads workshops and executive sessions on corporate innovation, venture capital, Silicon Valley, and strategic decision-making for senior leaders around the world.
