= Harry V. Roberts =

- Born: 1923
- Died: August 14, 2004 (aged 80–81); South Holland, Illinois, US
- Citizenship: American
- Education: University of Chicago
- Spouse: June Roberts
- Children: 2
- Awards: Norman Maclean Faculty Award (1997)
- Scientific career
- Fields: Bayesian statistics
- Workplaces: University of Chicago
- Doctoral students: Eugene Fama

Harry V. Roberts (1923 – August 14, 2004) was an American statistician who applied Bayesian statistics to business decision making and in total quality management.

== Biography ==
Roberts received an A.B. from the University of Chicago in 1943, and shortly thereafter was drafted to serve in World War II in the 4th Armored Division. After fighting in France and Belgium, he was captured during the Battle of the Bulge and became a prisoner of war. After the war, Roberts returned to Chicago and earned an Master of Business Administration with honors from the University of Chicago in 1947. He then worked in marketing research at McCann-Erickson.

Roberts began teaching at the University of Chicago Graduate School of Business in 1949 as an instructor of statistics. He was promoted to assistant professor in 1951.

He earned his Ph.D. from the University of Chicago in 1955, and was appointed associate professor. He was made full professor in 1959.

Roberts was an early computer enthusiast, and was especially interested in developing computer methods for statistical analysis. In the late 1960s, Roberts, in collaboration with his wife June and Robert Ling, developed a statistics package called Interactive Data Analysis (IDA), used for statistical instruction at top business schools.

He was named Sigmund E. Edelstone Professor of Statistics and Quality Management in 1991.

Roberts became Professor Emeritus in 1993. He retired in 1995, although he continued teaching courses in the GSB’s Executive Education program.

In 1997, Roberts was awarded the Norman Maclean Faculty Award from the University of Chicago for his contributions to teaching and to the student experience on campus.

In recognition of his career achievements, the Chicago chapter of the American Statistical Association created the Harry V. Roberts Statistical Advocate Award, first given in January 2002.

His varied research interests also included interactive computing; time series analysis; the relation between statistical theory and practical decision making; survey methodology and practice; and productivity and quality improvement.

Toward the end of his career, Roberts helped develop a curriculum in Total Quality Management at Chicago GSB.

== Personal life ==
Roberts was married to June, of South Holland. They had a son, Andrew, and daughter, Mary.

The Roberts family lived in Homewood, Illinois, for nearly 50 years. Roberts served as chairman of the Zone Board of Appeals and as a member of the Plan Commission and Rezoning Commission, and he provided enrollment projections for Homewood-Flossmoor High School.

Roberts competed in many marathons and triathlons. He died of pneumonia on August 14, 2004 at Rest Haven South nursing home in South Holland, Illinois.

== Bibliography ==
- Basic Methods of Marketing Research, with James Lorie
- Statistics: A New Approach, with W. Allen Wallis
- "Differencing of Random Walks and Near Random Walks", on the random walk hypothesis of stock market prices, with Nicholas Gonedes; published in the Journal of Econometrics in 1977
- Quality is Personal: A Foundation for Total Quality Management, with B. F. Sergesketter

== See also ==
- List of University of Chicago faculty
