= Urjit Patel =

24th Governor of Reserve Bank of India

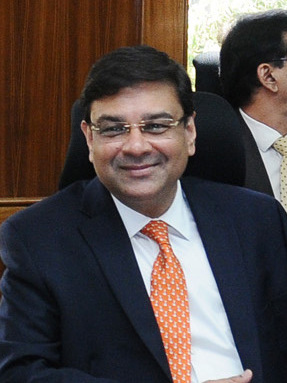

Executive Director at International Monetary Fund
- Incumbent
- Assumed office 1 September 2025
- Appointed by: Appointments Committee of the Cabinet
- Preceded by: Krishnamurthy Subramanian

Chairman of National Institute of Public Finance and Policy
- In office 19 June 2020 – 31 August 2025
- Preceded by: Vijay Kelkar

24th Governor of the Reserve Bank of India
- In office 4 September 2016 – 10 December 2018
- Preceded by: Raghuram Rajan
- Succeeded by: Shaktikanta Das

Deputy Governor of Reserve Bank of India
- In office 11 January 2013 - 4 September 2016
- Governor: Duvvuri Subbarao; Raghuram Rajan
- Succeeded by: Viral Acharya

Personal details
- Born: Urjit Ravindra Patel; 28 October 1963 (age 62) Nairobi, British Kenya
- Education: London School of Economics (BSc); University of Oxford (M.Phil.); Yale University (Ph.D.)
- Profession: Economist

Urjit Patel (born 28 October 1963) is a Kenyan-born Indian economist, who served as the 24th Governor of the Reserve Bank of India from 2016 to 2018 and is currently serving as the Executive Director at the International Monetary Fund representing India, Bangladesh, Bhutan and Sri Lanka. He also serves as the Chairman of National Institute of Public Finance and Policy, additional director of Britannia Industries and independent director of John Cockerill India.

== Early life and education ==
Urjit Patel was born in Nairobi on 28 October 1963 to Manjula and Ravindra Patel. His grandfather had migrated from Mahudha village in Kheda district, Gujarat to Kenya in the 20th century. His father ran Rexo Products Ltd, a chemical factory in Nairobi.

He studied in Nairobi at Jamhuri High School, and prior to that the Gujarati community-run Visa Oshwal Primary School. He studied at the London School of Economics for a Bachelor of Science degree in 1984. He obtained an M.Phil. degree from University of Oxford in 1986. He was conferred a Ph.D. in economics from Yale University in 1990. He was at IMF India Desk during the 1991–94 transition period.

== Professional career ==
After obtaining his Ph.D., Patel joined the International Monetary Fund (IMF) in 1990, where he worked on the US, India, Bahamas and Myanmar desks till 1995. Thereafter he went on deputation from the IMF to the Reserve Bank of India (RBI), where he played an advisory role in the development of the debt market, banking sector reforms, pension fund reforms, and targeting of real exchange rate.

Between 2000 and 2004, Patel worked with several High-Level Committees at both Central and State Government levels:

- Task Force on Direct Taxes
- Prime Minister's Task Force on Infrastructure
- Group of Ministers on Telecom Matters
- Committee on Civil Aviation Reforms
- Expert Group on State Electricity Boards
- High-Level Expert Group on Civil and Defence Services Pension System
- Competition Commission of India

Born in Kenya in a Gujarati family, Patel became a naturalised Indian citizen in 2013 before joining the RBI. On 11 January 2013, Patel was appointed as Deputy Governor of RBI for a period of three years; he was appointed for another three-year term in January 2016

On 20 August 2016, he was appointed as the governor of Reserve Bank Of India (RBI). During his tenure, the Government of India demonetised the ₹500 and ₹1000 banknotes of the Mahatma Gandhi Series, with the stated intention of curbing corruption, black money, fake currency and terrorism from 9 November 2016.

On 10 December 2018 at 17:15 hrs IST, Urjit Patel resigned from the post of Governor of the Reserve Bank of India (RBI) effective immediately.

In June 2022, Patel was appointed as the Vice President for investment-operations for the Beijing-based Asian Infrastructure Investment Bank (AIIB), one of the leading multilateral banks in the world.

In August 2025 Indian Government appointed Patel as the Executive Director at the International Monetary Fund representing India, Bangladesh, Bhutan and Sri Lanka for a three year term.

== Controversies ==
Although Patel cited personal reasons for resigning from RBI, experts have opined that he was forced to exit because of serious differences with the Government of India. The latter wanted more money from RBI to balance its fiscal deficit, which Patel did not agree to, citing requirement for long-term financial stability.

In addition, there was a view in the government that RBI's stringent policies were hurting credit growth which may affect the economic growth of the nation in the future. Chief Economic Advisor Arvind Subramanian said that while he respected the RBI’s decision, there was a “plausible alternative macroeconomic assessment” and that a monetary policy easing was required for economic growth.

There was also a growing perception that Patel had boxed himself into a corner by not communicating sufficiently with stakeholders or responding to market situation.

In August 2019 Nitin Gadkari fueled the controversy when he stated that he had advised the Union Finance Minister to remove the RBI Governor because the latter was inflexible and adamant.

However, on his departure, Prime Minister Narendra Modi and Finance Minister Arun Jaitley appreciated Patel for his work in RBI.

== Important positions ==
- Nonresident Senior Fellow, The Brookings Institution, Washington D. C. (2009-2012)
- Advisor, Boston Consulting Group
- President (Business Development), Reliance Industries (2007-2011)
- Executive Director, Infrastructure Development Finance Company (1997-2006)
- Member, Integrated Energy Policy Committee, Government of India (2004-2006)
- Non-Executive Director, Gujarat State Petroleum Corporation
- Non-Executive Director, Multi Commodity Exchange of India Limited
- Deputy Governor, Reserve Bank of India (11 January 2013 - 3 September 2016)
- Governor, Reserve Bank of India (4 September 2016 - 10 December 2018)
- Executive Director at the International Monetary Fund representing India, Bangladesh, Bhutan and Sri Lanka. (2025-2028)

== Awards ==
- Recipient of the Wilbur Cross Medal, Yale University, October 2019. Citation from Dean's letter: "This award not only recognizes your work as the twenty-fourth Governor of The Reserve Bank of India, it is a testament to your achievements in public service and your many contributions to scholarship".
- Elected Honorary Fellow, University of Oxford 2019.
