= Dave Butler (basketball, born 1964/1965) =

American basketball player

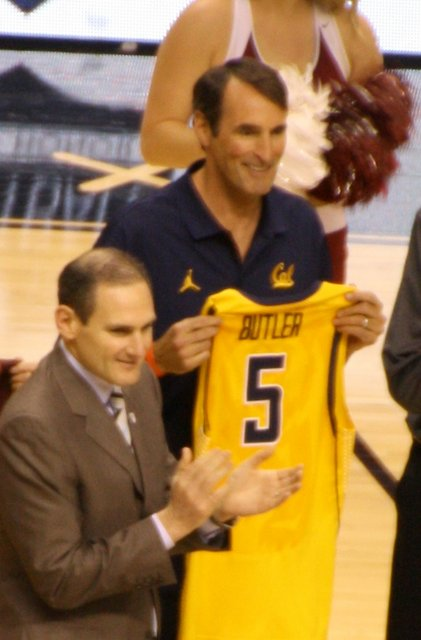
- Butler in 2014

Personal information
- Born: 1964 or 1965 (age 61–62) Rancho Palos Verdes, California, U.S.
- Listed height: 6 ft 9 in (2.06 m)
- Listed weight: 225 lb (102 kg)

Career information
- High school: Rolling Hills (Rolling Hills Estates, California)
- College: California (1983–1987)
- NBA draft: 1987: 5th round, 114th overall pick
- Drafted by: Boston Celtics
- Position: Forward
- Number: 5

Career highlights
- Pac-10 Freshman of the Year (1983)
- Stats at Basketball Reference

Dave Butler (born 1964 or 1965) is an American businessman and former professional basketball player. He is the co-chief executive officer (CEO) of Dimensional Fund Advisors, a global investment firm.

Butler played college basketball for the California Golden Bears, twice leading them to the National Invitation Tournament (NIT) after a 25-year postseason absence for the program. In his first season, he was honored as freshman player of the year in the Pac-10 Conference (now Pac-12). He played professionally in Turkey and Japan.

== Basketball ==
=== Amateur ===
Butler played basketball at Rolling Hills High School in Rolling Hills Estates in Los Angeles County, California. His father and brother were alumni of Loyola Marymount University, who recruited Butler to play college basketball. However, Butler chose to play for the California Golden Bears.

At the University of California, Berkeley, Butler began his career as the Pac-10 Freshman of the Year in 1983. Under first-year coach Lou Campanelli, the Bears qualified for the 1986 NIT, the school's first postseason appearance since 1960. Butler led the team that season in rebounding with 7.9 per game, and was second in scoring (11.8) behind Kevin Johnson. Earlier that season on January 25, 1986, Butler had 23 points and 10 rebounds in one of the best games in his career, as the Bears won 75–67 to snap a 52-game losing streak to the UCLA Bruins.

Cal returned to the NIT in 1987, advancing to the quarterfinals. Butler finished his career at Cal with the school record for games started (113), and also left fourth in Cal history in career rebounds (814) and seventh in scoring (1,291).

Butler graduated with a Bachelor of Science in marketing and finance in 1986, and was a Rhodes Scholar candidate. He was inducted into the Cal Athletic Hall of Fame in 2011, and named to the Pac-12 Hall of Honor in 2014.

=== Professional ===
A 6-foot-9-inch (2.06 m) forward, Butler was drafted by the Boston Celtics of National Basketball Association (NBA) in the fifth round of the 1987 NBA draft, but chose to play professionally in Turkey. In his only season there in Istanbul, he suffered a major calf injury that all but eliminated any possibility of him playing in the NBA. He played one more year in Japan with the Isuzu Motors Lynx.

== Post-basketball career ==
Butler returned to Cal and earned a Master of Business Administration (MBA) at the Haas School of Business in 1990. He joined Merrill Lynch in 1991, working there for four years before joining Dimensional Fund Advisors.

In 1995, Butler joined Dimensional as a regional director. He earned his CFA designation three years later. At Dimensional, he led the development of the firm’s financial advisor business and served as head of global financial advisor services. He was named Co-CEO of Dimensional in 2017 and serves on the board of directors. He also serves as a director on the boards of Dimensional’s U.S. mutual funds and exchange-traded funds. Throughout his career, Butler has been closely involved in the field of investment advice and the community of wealth management professionals. Since he joined Dimensional, the firm has grown from roughly $10 billion in assets under management to around $800 billion.

Butler also serves on the advisory board of the University of Texas Wealth Management Network, which is part of Texas’ McCombs School of Business.

== Personal life ==
Butler's younger brother, Greg, played college basketball for Cal's rival, Stanford, before also playing professionally in the NBA.
