= Joint hypothesis problem =

The joint hypothesis problem is the problem that testing for market efficiency is difficult, or even impossible. Any attempts to test for market (in)efficiency must involve asset pricing models so that there are expected returns to compare to real returns. It is not possible to measure 'abnormal' returns without expected returns predicted by pricing models. Therefore, anomalous market returns may reflect market inefficiency, an inaccurate asset pricing model or both.

This problem is discussed in Fama's (1970) influential review of the theory and evidence on efficient markets, and was often used to argue against interpreting early stock market anomalies as mispricing.

Other arguments used by efficient market advocates include the Roll critique, which points at that testing a specific asset pricing model, the capital asset pricing model, is impossible. Roll's critique centers on the fact that the market portfolio includes all human wealth, and is not observable. Refinements of the capital asset pricing model imply that the information set of observers is important, and since this information set is not observable, one cannot test the capital asset pricing model even if the market portfolio is observed.
