= Stefan Nagel =

German-American financial economist

- Born: Germany

Academic background
- Education: London Business School; University of Trier

Stefan Nagel is a German-American financial economist and the Fama Family Distinguished Service Professor of Finance at the University of Chicago Booth School of Business. His research focuses on asset pricing, investor behavior, and the formation of investor expectations.

== Biography ==
Prior to joining the University of Chicago faculty in 2017, he taught at the Stanford Graduate School of Business and the University of Michigan Ross School of Business. He served as editor of The Journal of Finance from 2016-2022, and was an editor at The Review of Financial Studies from 2014-2015.

Professor Nagel is a research associate at the National Bureau of Economic Research (Cambridge, MA) and a research fellow at the Centre for Economic Policy Research (London, UK). In 2024, he was named as an independent director of Dimensional Fund Advisors's U.S. Mutual Funds and ETFs.

He completed his Diplom in Business Economics at the University of Trier, and earned his PhD at London Business School.

== Works ==
Nagel has authored over 50 academic articles and is the author of Machine Learning in Asset Pricing, published by Princeton University Press in 2021. In 2004 he won the Smith Breeden best paper prize (Journal of Finance) for his article "Hedge Funds and the Technology Bubble". He won the Fama/DFA best paper prize (Journal of Financial Economics) as a co-author twice, in 2006 for the article "The Conditional CAPM Does Not Explain Asset Pricing Anomalies" and in 2020 for the article "Shrinking the cross section".
