= Fiscal theory of the price level =

Theory of fiscal policy

The fiscal theory of the price level is the idea that government fiscal policy, including debt and taxes present and future, is the primary determinant of the price level or inflation as opposed to the quantity theory of money. The theory is one of the strongest advocates in the debate among mainstream economists for combating inflation primarily through fiscal policy instead of monetary policy. The theory also disputes the premise of Modern Monetary Theory that inflation can be controlled when it starts to rise.

FTPL focuses on the confidence the government will not default on its debts, but rather 'inflate away' debts. It suggests that currency is like a stock in a government and if the government has structural deficit then the 'stock' loses value. The theory argues that central banks cannot stop inflation by themselves if there is not a credible effort to balance the books. Part of this stems from the argument that extra spending on interest payments on government debt is in and of itself inflationary.

John Cochrane argues that the key factor in when inflation gets out of control is when people lose confidence that a nation's debt will be repaid, and thus start to expect and prepare for inflation. He also argues that for cases when large deficits are not accompanied by inflation, the deficits could have been preventing deflation. Cochrane further argues that interest rates should not be raised above the rate of inflation.

== Statement ==
In nominal terms, government must pay off its existing domestic liabilities (government debt denominated in local currency units) either by refinancing (rolling over the debt, issuing new debt to pay the old) or amortizing (paying it off from surpluses in tax revenue). In real terms, a government can also inflate away the debt: if it causes or allows high inflation, the real amount it must repay will be smaller. Alternatively, it could default on its obligations.

The fiscal theory states that if a government has an unsustainable fiscal policy, such that it will not be able to pay off its obligation in future out of tax revenue (it runs a persistent structural deficit), then it will pay them off via inflating the debt away. Thus, fiscal discipline, meaning a balanced budget over the course of the economic cycle is important to control inflation.

== History ==
Thomas Sargent and Neil Wallace wrote a 1981 paper arguing that unsustainable deficits eventually lead to the government having to print money to cover its debts leading to inflation that even higher interest rates would not be able to fix.

== Supporters ==
- Eric M. Leeper (1991)
- John H. Cochrane
- Michael Dean Woodford (1994, 1995, 2001)
- Christopher A. Sims (1994)
- Veronique de Rugy (2022)

== Critics ==
- Narayana Kocherlakota and Christopher Phelan
- Willem Buiter (2002)
- Bennett T. McCallum (1999, 2001, 2003), Oscar Arce, and Dirk Niepelt
