= Avanidhar Subrahmanyam =

- Education: Ph.D. in Finance
- Occupation: Professor
- Employer: University of California
- Known for: Economics and Finance

Avanidhar Subrahmanyam (born September 16, 1962) is the Goldyne and Irwin Hearsh Distinguished Professor of Finance at the Anderson Graduate School of Management, University of California at Los Angeles (UCLA). He is known for his research in stock market activity and behavioral finance, and has published a number of papers on financial markets.

== Education ==
Subrahmanyam studied at the University of California, Los Angeles in the late 1980s. He graduated with a Ph.D. from the University of California, Los Angeles in June 1990.

== Career ==
Prior to joining UCLA, he held positions as an Assistant professor and later as an Associate Professor of Finance and Economics at the Graduate School of Business at Columbia University, from July 1990 to June 1995. He joined the Anderson Graduate School of Management at UCLA in July 1994 as an Acting Associate Professor of Finance, becoming an Associate Professor in July 1996 and a Professor in July 1997. In July 2014, he was appointed as the Goldyne and Irwin Hearsh Distinguished Professor of Finance at the Anderson Graduate School of Management, UCLA.

== Research ==
Subrahmanyam is mainly known for two academic contributions: The first is a behavioral (psychological) theory for the superior performance of value stocks and the phenomenon of stock market momentum. This contribution was adjudged to be the winner of the Smith Breeden prize for the best paper published in The Journal of Finance during 1998. The second contribution is to document that market liquidity exhibits systematic variation across stocks, just like returns, which led to a number of studies analyzing why trading costs fluctuate over time. This contribution won the Fama-DFA award for the best paper in Capital Markets in the Journal of Financial Economics for 2000.

In the press, Subrahmanyam discussed Apple Inc.'s stock price in 2013, when there was a spike in trading prices. Following it racing to a record high of over $700, the stock quickly fell to below $400 for the first time since 2011. Appearing on CNBC, Subrahmanyam stated that the activity was likely due to over exuberance on the upside can lead to herd-like behaviour. During the same year, he also commentated on the growth of the bitcoin currency. Subrahmanyam stated that he believed one of the biggest drawbacks of the crypto-currency was that merchants were not made to accept the currency, which leads to uncertainty in its everyday use.

His research and work has led him to be the author or co-author of numerous articles in refereed finance and economic journals. Recent research positions have ranged from the relationship between a company's stock and their cost of capital, while also studying theories on asset price behaviour and equity returns.

His research has garnered significant recognition, as indicated by his Web of Knowledge cite count of over 13,450 and a Google Scholar cite count exceeding 47,000 (with an h-index of 72 and an i10 index of 150 as of April 2025). He is ranked among the top 3 worldwide for all-time research productivity in finance based on publications in the top four finance journals (Journal of Finance, Journal of Financial Economics, Review of Financial 1 Studies, and Journal of Financial and Quantitative Analysis).

== Research positions ==
Subrahmanyam is a founding co-editor and advisory editor for Elsevier's The Journal of Financial Markets. He was previously an associate editor of The Review of Financial Studies and The Journal of Finance. Subrahmanyam has served as part of the Working Research Group on Market Microstructure at the National Bureau of Economic Research and on the organizing committee for the NBER annual conferences on market microstructure.

He has also served as a consultant to the UK Government Office for Science on stock market circuit breakers.

== Public engagement and service ==
His research has been featured in various media outlets including the Financial Times, The Wall Street Journal, Los Angeles Times, San Francisco Chronicle, Los Angeles Daily News, LA Business Journal, Atlanta Journal-Constitution, and San Jose Mercury News. He has appeared on CNBC as well as CNN Headline News, and on marketplace.org.

== Selected publications ==
- Daniel, K., Hirshleifer, D., & Subrahmanyam, A. (1998). Investor psychology and security market under- and overreactions. The Journal of Finance, 53(6), 1839–1885.
- Chordia, T., Roll, R., & Subrahmanyam, A. (2001). Market liquidity and trading activity. The Journal of Finance, 56(2), 501-530.
- Subrahmanyam, A., & Titman, S. (1999). The going‐public decision and the development of financial markets. The Journal of Finance, 54(3), 1045-1082.
- Subrahmanyam, A. (2007). Behavioural finance: A review and synthesis. European Financial Management, 14(1), 12–49.
- Chordia, T., Roll, R., & Subrahmanyam, A. (2002). Order imbalance, liquidity, and market returns. Journal of Financial economics, 65(1), 111-130.
- Daniel, K., Hirshleifer, D., & Subrahmanyam, A. (2001). Overconfidence, arbitrage, and equilibrium asset pricing. The Journal of Finance, 56(3), 921–965.
- Subrahmanyam, A., Tang, K., Wang, J., & Yang, X. (2024). Leverage Is a Double‐Edged Sword. The Journal of Finance, 79(2), 1579-1634.

== Awards and honors ==
- Goldyne and Irwin Hearsh Distinguished Professor of Finance, Anderson Graduate School of Management, University of California at Los Angeles (UCLA) (July 2014 – present).
- Best Paper Award at the Western Finance Association meetings
- Best Paper Award at the International Conference of Finance in Taiwan
- Fama-DFA Prize for the best paper in investments published in the Journal of Financial Economics (2000)
- Smith Breeden Prize for best paper at the Journal of Finance
