= Rodney McMillian =

American artist

- Born: 1969 (age 56–57); Columbia, South Carolina
- Known for: Visual Art
- Website: https://rodneymcmillian.com

Rodney McMillian (born 1969) is an artist based in Los Angeles. McMillian is a Professor of Sculpture at the UCLA School of Arts and Architecture at the University of California, Los Angeles. He received a MacArthur Fellowship in 2026.

== Early life and education ==
McMillian grew up in Columbia, South Carolina. His mother worked for the U.S. Equal Employment Opportunity Commission and his father was a bus driver.

McMillian holds a BA in Foreign Affairs from the University of Virginia. He studied art at the School of the Art Institute of Chicago and the Skowhegan School of Painting and Sculpture, and received a Master of Fine Arts degree from the California Institute of the Arts in 2002. During his studies, McMillian explored various mediums, including sculpture, painting, film, and installation art.

== Work ==
McMillian has said that his time in graduate school was an effort to broaden his artistic communication abilities. He was also influenced by musician and performer Prince, who was known for his versatility in playing multiple instruments. McMillian admired Prince's ability to control the message he wanted to send through his music, and sought to emulate that in his own work.

In 2019, McMillian's solo exhibition at the Underground Museum in Los Angeles, Brown: videos from The Black Show, featured several video works originally presented in his 2016 solo exhibition The Black Show at the ICA Philadelphia. Many of the videos were created in his home state of South Carolina, while others were filmed around Dockery Plantation in Mississippi, where some claim the Delta blues was birthed.

The characters in McMillian's films wore costumes and delivered song lyrics, political sermons, and children’s stories. He set the films in a lush but hostile Southern landscape of moonlit fields and buzzing swamps.

The first West Coast presentation of McMillian’s opera, Hanging With Clarence, was staged at the Bethlehem Baptist Church in Compton. His monumental installation In This Land was on view as part of the New Work series at the San Francisco Museum of Modern Art in early 2019. He received The Contemporary Austin’s first Suzanne Deal Booth Art Prize in 2016, and the resulting solo exhibition Against a Civic Death was on view in 2018.

McMillian's 2010 work in black vinyl, Succulent, is prominently installed in the Agnes Gund Garden Lobby at the Museum of Modern Art in New York. He has described it as a “portal to another world,” referencing his interest in science fiction writers like Octavia Butler and Samuel R. Delany.

A selection of McMillian’s video works addressing the political histories of the United States was on view in September 2020 in the solo exhibition Rodney McMillian: Historically Hostile at the Blaffer Art Museum in Houston.

McMillian's 2012 solo exhibition Prospect Ave was shown at Maccarone in New York and featured found-object sculpture, site-specific installation, video, and paintings. He presented a solo exhibition of paintings, Recirculating Goods, at Petzel Gallery in New York in 2020. He painted with latex on afghans or crocheted objects purchased at thrift stores and antique shops, sometimes with the price tags still attached. The pieces explored how class and ideals have informed American landscape painting, and how handmade objects move through the economy.

== Exhibitions ==
McMillian’s work has been exhibited at the UCLA Hammer Museum and the Museum of Contemporary Art, Los Angeles, the Studio Museum in Harlem New York, the Herning Art Museum in Denmark, the Royal Academy in London, the Rubell Museum in Miami, Boston's Institute of Contemporary Art, and the Whitney.

== Collections ==
McMillian’s work features in collections including the San Antonio Museum of Art, the Harald Falckenberg Collection and the Saatchi Gallery.
