= Jonathan Lewellen =

American economist

- Education: University of Rochester; Indiana University
- Occupation: Professor

Jonathan Lewellen is an American economist, currently the Carl E. and Catherine M. Heidt Professor of Finance at Dartmouth College and formerly the Jon D. Gruber Career Development Chair at Sloan School of Management.

In 2024, Lewellen signed a faculty letter supporting Dartmouth College president Sian Beilock, who ordered the arrest of 90 students and faculty members nonviolently protesting the Gaza war.
