= Manju Puri =

Economist

Manju Puri is an economist who currently works as the J. B. Fuqua Professor of Finance at the Fuqua School of Business at Duke University.

She is an editor at the Review of Financial Studies and currently the director of the American Finance Association.

Puri is director of the Center for Financial Research at the Federal Deposit Insurance Corporation (FDIC). In 2015–2016, she was on the Federal Reserve Board Model Validation Council.

== Career and education ==
Puri has a Ph.D. in finance from New York University and holds an MBA from the Indian Institute of Management in Ahmedabad. Before her career as an academic, she was a corporate banking executive at HSBC in London and Mumbai.

She started her academic career as an assistant professor at Stanford University and was promoted to associate professor in 2000. She left Stanford in 2003 to join Duke University.

She has held visiting positions at the Reserve Bank of India (2018–2019), the University of Amsterdam (2005), the Federal Reserve Bank of New York (2004 and 2012) and Yale University (1997–98).

== Research ==
Puri's research focuses on empirical corporate finance, financial intermediation, banking, venture capital and entrepreneurship. She has published in the Journal of Finance, the Review of Financial Studies, the Journal of Financial Economics and the American Economic Review.

Her paper "Deposit Inflows and Outflows in Failing Banks: The Role of Deposit Insurance" (with Chris Martin and Alexander Brenden Ufier) has won the best paper award from Financial Asset Management association.

Her works have been cited more than 20,000 times according to Google Scholar.

Her research has been quoted in The New York Times, Forbes, CNBC, Fox Business and The Atlantic.

=== Selected bibliography ===
- Hellmann, Thomas; Puri, Manju (2002). "Venture Capital and the Professionalization of Start-Up Firms: Empirical Evidence". The Journal of Finance. 57 (1): 169–197.
- Hellmann, Thomas; Puri, Manju (2000-10-01). "The Interaction between Product Market and Financing Strategy: The Role of Venture Capital". The Review of Financial Studies. 13 (4): 959–984.
- Iyer, Rajkamal; Puri, Manju (2012/06). "Understanding Bank Runs: The Importance of Depositor-Bank Relationships and Networks". American Economic Review. 102 (4): 1414–1445.
- Graham, John R.; Harvey, Campbell R.; Puri, Manju (2013-07-01). "Managerial attitudes and corporate actions". Journal of Financial Economics. 109 (1): 103–121.
