= Anthony Saunders (economist) =

American academic

Anthony Saunders is a British academic. He is the John M. Schiff Professor of Finance at New York University Stern School of Business and as of 2009 was on the Executive Committee of the Salomon Center of the Study of Financial Institutions.

== Education ==
Saunders received his Bachelor of Science, Master of Science, and Doctor of Philosophy from the London School of Economics.

== Career ==
Saunders has taught at New York University since 1978, and his teaching and research have specialized in financial institutions and international banking. He has also served as a visiting professor all over the world, including at INSEAD, the Stockholm School of Economics, and the University of Melbourne.

Saunders holds positions on the Board of Academic Consultants of the Federal Reserve Board of Governors as well as on the Council of Research Advisors for the Federal National Mortgage Association. In addition, he has acted as a visiting scholar at the comptroller of the Currency and at the Federal Monetary Fund.

Saunders is an editor of the Journal of Banking and Finance and the Journal of Financial Markets, Instruments and Institutions, and is an associate editor of eight other journals, including Financial Management and the Journal of Money, Credit and Banking. He has written two books and over 70 books, and his research has been published in all of the major finance and banking journals and in several books.

== Selected publications ==
- Ronen, Joshua; Saunders, Anthony; Sondhi, Ashwinpaul C. (1990). Off-Balance Sheet Activities. New York: Bloomsbury Publishing USA. ISBN 978-0-313-36668-0.
- Saunders, Anthony; Walter, Ingo (1994). Universal Banking in the United States: What Could We Gain? What Could We Lose?. New York Oxford: Oxford university press. ISBN 978-0-19-508069-8.
- Cornett, Marcia Millon; Saunders, Anthony (1999). Fundamentals of Financial Institutions Management. Boston: Irwin McGraw-Hill. ISBN 978-0-256-25367-2.
- Saunders, Anthony (2000). Financial Institutions Management: A Modern Perspective. Boston: Irwin/McGraw-Hill. ISBN 978-0-07-303259-7.
