= Robert F. Stambaugh =

American economist

Robert F. Stambaugh is an American financial economist and the Miller Anderson & Sherrerd Professor of Finance at the Wharton School of the University of Pennsylvania. He is known for his research on return predictability, portfolio choice, liquidity risk, investor sentiment, and sustainable investing.

== Early life and education ==
Stambaugh earned his B.A. in economics and mathematics from Dickinson College in 1974, followed by an M.B.A. in 1976 and a Ph.D. in finance and econometrics from the University of Chicago in 1981.

== Career ==
He began his academic career at the Wharton School in 1979, and then joined the University of Chicago's Graduate School of Business in 1983, rising to full professor. In 1988 he returned to Wharton, first as the Donaldson, Lufkin & Jenrette Term Professor of Finance, then as the Ronald O. Perelman Professor of Finance, and, since 2008, as the Miller Anderson & Sherrerd Professor of Finance. He was a Marvin Bower Fellow at Harvard Business School in 1997-1998.

Stambaugh served as President of the American Finance Association in 2013 and was a member of its Board of Directors from 1988 to 1990. He is a Fellow of both the American Finance Association (2014) and the Financial Management Association (2010) and is a Research Associate of the National Bureau of Economic Research (NBER).

His research has been recognized with numerous awards, including five Fama-DFA Prizes from the Journal of Financial Economics anda Smith-Breeden Prize from the Journal of Finance and two Moskowitz Prizes in sustainable finance.

== Research ==
Stambaugh's early work with Donald B. Keim examined the predictability of stock and bond returns, while research with Shmuel Kandel considered stock-return predictability from an asset-allocation perspective. His 1999 work examined finite-sample bias in predictive regressions involving lagged stochastic variables.

With Luboš Pástor, he studied liquidity risk and found that stocks with greater exposure to aggregate liquidity risk earned higher expected returns. With Jianfeng Yu and Yu Yuan, he examined investor sentiment, short-sale constraints, and stock-return anomalies. With Pástor and Lucian A. Taylor, he has studied diseconomies of scale in active management and sustainable investing, including the pricing and performance of green assets.

== Selected Bibliography ==
- Pástor, Ľ.; Stambaugh, R. F.; Taylor, L. A. (2022). "Dissecting green returns". Journal of Financial Economics. 146 (2): 403-424.
- Pástor, Ľ.; Stambaugh, R. F.; Taylor, L. A. (2021). "Sustainable investing in equilibrium". Journal of Financial Economics. 142 (2): 550-571.
- Pástor, Ľ.; Stambaugh, R. F.; Taylor, L. A. (2015). "Scale and skill in active management". Journal of Financial Economics. 116 (1): 23-45.
- Stambaugh, R. F.; Yu, J.; Yuan, Y. (2012). "The Short of It: Investor Sentiment and Anomalies". Journal of Financial Economics. 104 (2): 288-302.
- Pástor, Ľ.; Stambaugh, R. F. (2003). "Liquidity Risk and Expected Stock Returns". Journal of Political Economy. 111 (3): 642-685.
- Stambaugh, R. F. (1999). "Predictive regressions". Journal of Financial Economics. 54 (3): 375-421.
