= Fedora Veronesi =

Italian basketball player (born 1926)

Personal information
- Born: 25 May 1926 Bologna, Italy
- Died: 24 February 2019 (aged 92) Padua, Italy
- Listed height: 1.80 m (5 ft 11 in)

Fedora Veronesi (25 May 1926 – 24 February 2019) was an Italian basketball player.
