= Christopher J. Malloy =

American economist

Christopher J. Malloy is an American economist currently the Sylvan C. Coleman Professor of Financial Management at Harvard Business School.

== Education ==
- PhD in Finance and MBA from The University of Chicago Graduate School of Business
- BA in Economics from Yale University
