= Dimensional Fund Advisors =

American private investment firm

- Type: Private
- Industry: Finance
- Founded: 1981; 45 years ago
- Founders: David G. Booth; Rex Sinquefield
- Headquarters: Austin, Texas, United States
- Key people: David G. Booth (Executive Chairman); Dave Butler (Co-CEO); Gerard K. O'Reilly (Co-CEO)
- Products: Money Management and Investment
- AUM: ▲$1 trillion (Feb 9, 2026)
- Number of employees: 1,500+ (2024)
- Website: www.dimensional.com

Dimensional Fund Advisors, L.P. (branded Dimensional abbreviated DFA) is a privately owned investment firm headquartered in Austin, Texas. Dimensional was founded in Brooklyn in 1981 by David Booth, Rex Sinquefield and Larry Klotz. The company has 15 international offices in the U.S., Canada, U.K., Germany, Netherlands, Australia, Singapore, and Japan. Dimensional maintains additional U.S. offices in Charlotte, North Carolina and Santa Monica, California.

The company's founders studied at the University of Chicago under Eugene Fama. Kenneth French is co-chair of the firm's investment research committee. DFA's investment strategy is based on application of the efficient market hypothesis. Dimensional was one of the earliest firms to offer passive investing and "runs the oldest small-cap index fund" in the United States. While academic research had long indicated smaller company stocks had potential for exceptionally good investing returns, Dimensional was one of the first to offer smaller stocks to institutional investors like pension funds and 401k plans, which had had long focused on larger company stocks. Smaller company stocks were more difficult to buy and sell as they traded in lower numbers, which increased the complexity for Dimensional to manage their funds. Thus, the firm's versions of index funds have the flexibility to trade daily and skew towards smaller company stocks and value stocks; They operate differently from most index funds which rebalance on specific dates and are weighted by market capitalization. This strategy results in regulators, such as the SEC, and some analysts describing the funds as actively managed. The company offers equity and fixed income mutual funds, Exchange-traded funds, separately managed accounts, and model portfolios.

In 2009, Dimensional acquired SmartNest, a retirement planning computer software company. Researcher Robert C. Merton left SmartNest's board after the purchase and became a Resident Scientist at Dimensional.

DFA had long used a strict model of selling their products only to institutions and through registered advisors. Advisors who sold DFA products were known for an evangelical zeal in their devotion to the company's theories, which was described as occasionally verging on cult-like. But in November 2020, the firm announced it was now offering openly accessed exchange-traded funds available to the general public.

== Board of Directors ==
Board of Directors of the general partner of Dimensional Fund Advisors LP:

- David G. Booth
- Eugene Fama
- Kenneth French
- Gerard K. O'Reilly
- Dave Butler

Board of Directors, Dimensional Mutual Funds and ETFs, US:

- Reena Aggarwal, Georgetown University
- Dave Butler, Co-CEO
- Douglas W. Diamond, University of Chicago
- Darrell Duffie, Stanford University Graduate School of Business
- Francis A. Longstaff, UCLA
- Stefan Nagel, University of Chicago
- Gerard K. O'Reilly, Co-CEO & Co-CIO
- Abbie J. Smith, University of Chicago
- Heather E. Tookes, Yale School of Management
- Ingrid M. Werner, The Ohio State University
