= Jeremy C. Stein =

American economist

Jeremy Stein
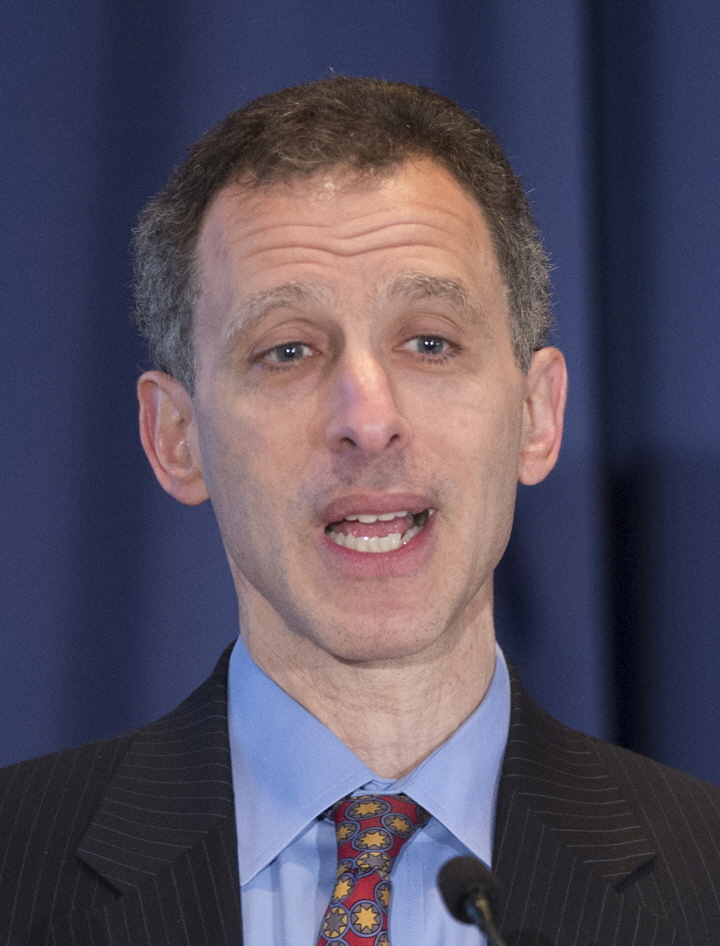

Member of the Federal Reserve Board of Governors
- In office May 30, 2012 – May 28, 2014
- President: Barack Obama
- Preceded by: Kevin Warsh
- Succeeded by: Randal Quarles

Personal details
- Born: Jeremy Chaim Stein; October 17, 1960 (age 66) Chicago, Illinois, U.S.
- Party: Democratic
- Children: 3
- Relatives: Elias M. Stein (father)
- Education: Princeton University (BA); Massachusetts Institute of Technology (PhD)

Academic background
- Doctoral advisor: Oliver Hart
- Website: Information at IDEAS / RePEc

Jeremy Chaim Stein (born October 17, 1960) is an American economist and the Moise Y. Safra Professor of Economics at Harvard University; he also chaired Harvard's economics department. He served as a member of the Federal Reserve Board of Governors from 2012 to 2014. Stein served as president of the American Finance Association in 2008.

== Early life and education ==
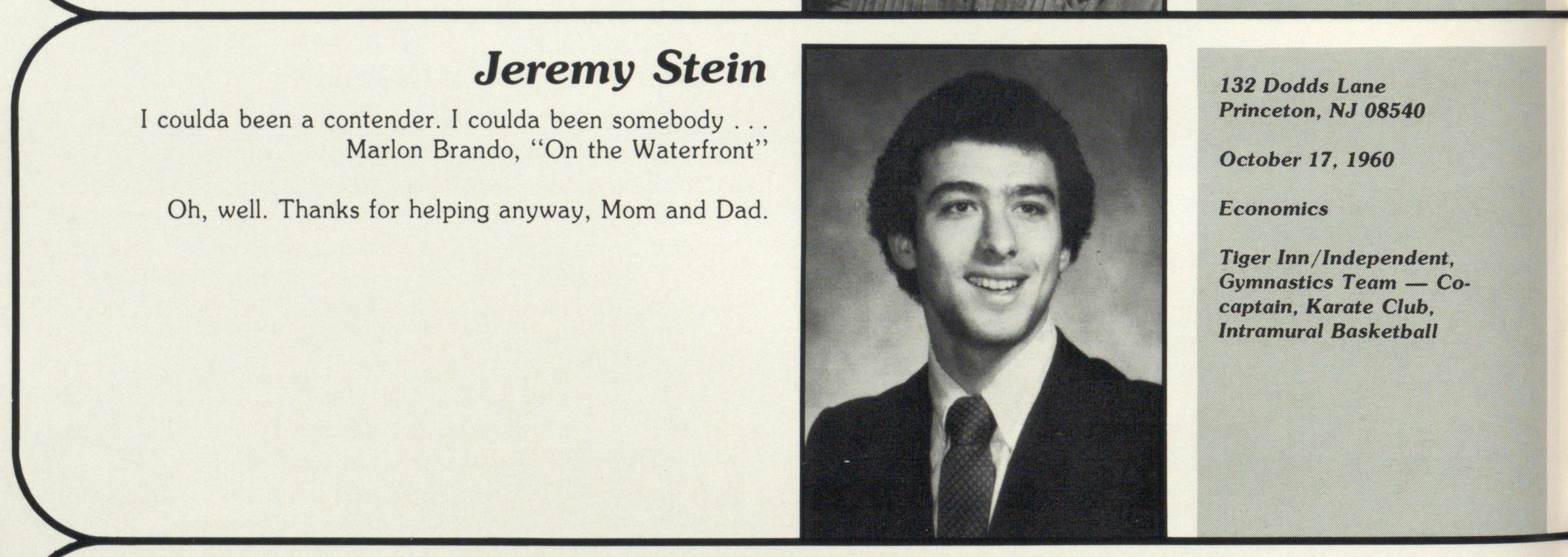
Stein in the Princeton University yearbook, 1983

Stein was born to a secular Jewish family, the son of mathematician Elias M. Stein and Elly Intrator. Both his parents were Jewish refugees during World War II who immigrated to the United States. He graduated summa cum laude with a B.A. in economics from Princeton University in 1983 after completing a 118-page senior thesis titled "Pseudo-Securities: An Analysis of Financially Hedged Positions." While at Princeton, he was co-captain of the men's gymnastics team, specializing in rings. In 1986, he earned a Ph.D. in economics from MIT. His 1998 paper "Risk management, capital budgeting, and capital structure policy for financial institutions: an integrated approach" with Kenneth A. Froot won the Jensen Prize.

== Career ==
After serving a one-year internship at Goldman Sachs Group Inc., he became an assistant professor of finance at the Harvard Business School from 1987 to 1990, and finance faculty of MIT's Sloan School of Management for ten years after that. Stein rejoined Harvard in 2000.

Stein received the Fama-DFA Prize, which is an annual prize given to authors with the best capital markets and asset pricing research papers published in the Journal of Financial Economics for 2002.

He was also a senior adviser to the Treasury secretary and was on the staff at the National Economic Council in 2009.

=== Federal Reserve Board ===
On December 27, 2011, President Barack Obama announced that he planned to nominate Stein to fill one of the two vacancies on the seven-member Federal Reserve Board. Stein's nomination was filibustered by Republicans in the United States Senate. On May 15, 2012, Senate Majority Leader Harry Reid motioned to invoke cloture and break the filibuster on both the nominations of Stein and of Jerome Powell. On May 17, 2012, a Senate floor vote was held on Stein's nomination with a required 60-vote threshold for confirmation. Senators voted 70–24 to confirm Stein.

On April 3, 2014, Stein announced that he would resign his position at the Federal Reserve and return to Harvard in May.

=== Research ===
Stein's research covers subjects including behavioral finance and market efficiency; corporate investment and financing decisions; risk management; capital allocation inside firms; banking; financial regulation; and monetary policy.

Stein is a research associate at the National Bureau of Economic Research. He is also a member of the American Academy of Arts and Sciences.

Still a Harvard economics professor, he was later selected for a 2026 expert panel reviewing the Federal Reserve's monetary policy strategy . ( Called the "Balance Sheet Policy Task Force.")

== Personal life ==
Stein is divorced with three children and lives in Boston. His daughter Carolyn is an economist at the University of California, Berkeley. He is a registered Democrat. He currently lives in Cambridge, Massachusetts.

Government offices
Preceded by Kevin Warsh	Member of the Federal Reserve Board of Governors; 2012–2014	Succeeded by Randal Quarles
