= Suzanne Deal Booth =

American art director, collector, philanthropist, and winemaker

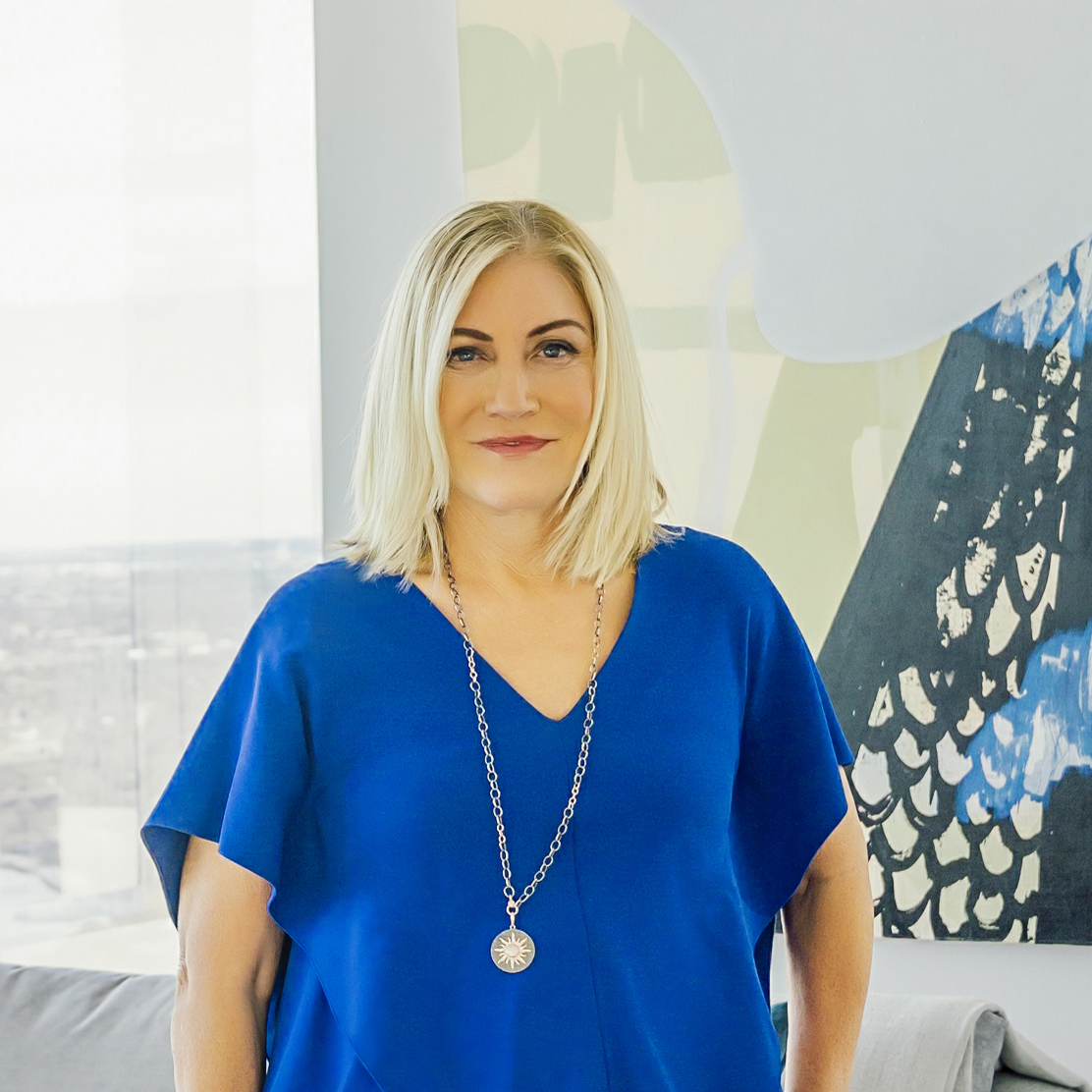
- Born: February 17, 1954 (age 72); Dallas, Texas, US
- Education: Rice University (BA); New York University (MA)
- Occupations: Art director, collector, philanthropist, winemaker
- Spouse: David G. Booth (m. 1988, divorced)
- Children: David; Erin

Suzanne Deal Booth (born February 17, 1954) is an American art director, collector, philanthropist, and vintner. She has worked as an arts advisor and is the Founder and the Director of Friends of Heritage Preservation (FOHP).

== Early life ==
Deal Booth was born in Dallas, Texas, and is the youngest child of Harry William Deal, author of Venus Rising, a memoir of his service in WW II, and Yvonne Rivers Deal.

== Education ==
Deal Booth attended Rice University receiving a BA (cum laude) in art history in 1977. While at Rice University, she worked at The Menil Collection.

In 1984 she received a Masters in Art History from the Institute of Fine Arts, New York University (NYU) and a Certificate in Art Conservation from the Conservation Center of the Institute of Fine Arts, New York University. Throughout her studies she was the protégé of Dominique de Menil.

She received a Kress Foundation fellowship in paintings conservation at the Centre Georges Pompidou, and interned at the Metropolitan Museum of Art (New York), Kimbell Art Museum (Fort Worth, TX), and at the Museum of New Mexico (Santa Fe, NM).

== Career ==
From 1986 to 1996, Deal Booth worked as the Getty Art History Information Program and Training Program Coordinator, Getty Conservation Institute.

In 1998, she founded Friends of Heritage Preservation (FOHP), a charitable giving group that works in partnership with individuals, organizations, museums, and foundations to promote cultural identity through the preservation of endangered artistic and historic works, artifacts, and sites.

Deal Booth served as a Gubernatorial appointment to the Board of the California Cultural & Historical Endowment from 2004- 2008 She has been a board member of Los Angeles County Museum of Art since 2002 and serves on the boards of the Menil Collection; The Blanton Museum of Art; Ballroom Marfa, and The Contemporary Austin, as well as serving on the advisory council of the Harry Ransom Center at the University of Texas at Austin. She is a former trustee of Rice University, the American Academy in Rome, the Institute of Fine Arts (New York University) and the Centre Pompidou Foundation.

In 2002, Suzanne Deal Booth and David G. Booth established the Booth Family Rome Prize Fellowship for Historic Preservation and Conservation at the American Academy in Rome, which is awarded on an annual basis and has supported over 15 fellowships.

In 2005, the Suzanne Deal Booth Collaborative Partnership, Rice University, Houston, Texas was created and in 2015 The Booth Center for Special Collections at Georgetown’s Lauinger Library – extensive collection of rare books, manuscripts and art was dedicated.

In 2012, Deal Booth was the patron for the James Turrell “Twilight Epiphany” Skyspace, Rice University, Houston, TX. The space was dedicated as the Suzanne Deal Booth Centennial Pavilion in 2012.

From 2015 to 2019, Suzanne Deal Booth served on Visiting Committees at the Metropolitan Museum of Art, including a committee for Objects Conservation.

In 2016, she created the Suzanne Deal Booth Prize at The Contemporary Austin. The prize was set to fund a $100,000 unrestricted award to an artist selected by an independent advisory committee comprising curators and art historians from across the U.S. and internationally, a scholarly publication, and all production expenses for the creation of new work for a solo exhibition that premieres at The Contemporary Austin in Texas. The first recipient was Rodney McMillian. In 2018, the prize was expanded through a partnership with FLAG Art Foundation in New York, renaming the prize as the Suzanne Deal Booth / FLAG Art Foundation Prize. Through the new partnership, the award was increased to $200,000, and funding was added for a second exhibition to show the recipient’s work in New York City at The FLAG Art Foundation. The first recipient of the expanded prize was Nicole Eisenman.

In 2017, the Suzanne Deal Booth Executive Director position was created at the Moody Center for the Arts at Rice University. In 2018 Deal Booth was listed as one of the top 200 collectors in the world in ARTnews. She is a Fellow of the American Institute of Conservation, Washington, DC. She is also a collector of Renaissance art, old master drawings, and contemporary art.

Deal Booth is an arts advocate focusing on education, arts, and cultural and historical preservation.

She runs the family vineyard in Rutherford, CA. In 2010, she bought the storied old Rutherford vineyard owned by Belle and Barney Rhodes, whose vines had supplied grapes to Heitz Cellars. In 2018, her winery, called Bella Oaks, released its first wine, a Cabernet Sauvignon. It was crafted by Nigel Kinsman, former winemaker for Araujo.

Suzanne participated in a panel with ARTnews during Art Basel Miami 2018. She was also on a panel called The Changing Role of Women in the Arts during SXSW 2019.

She has a particular interest in contemporary art, Old Master drawings, and Renaissance art.

== Personal life ==
She married David G. Booth in 1998, and have later divorced. They have a son, Chandler Booth, and a daughter, Erin Booth.
