= Roll's critique =

Validity analysis of the capital asset pricing model

Roll's critique is a famous analysis of the validity of empirical tests of the capital asset pricing model (CAPM) by Richard Roll. It concerns methods to formally test the statement of the CAPM, the equation

$$E(R_i) = R_f + \beta_{im}[E(R_m) - R_f].\,$$

This equation relates an asset's expected return $E(R_i)$ to the asset's sensitivity $\beta_{im}$ to the market portfolio return $R_m$. The market return is defined as the wealth-weighted sum of all investment returns in the economy.

Roll's critique makes two statements regarding the market portfolio:

1. Mean-variance tautology: Any mean-variance efficient portfolio $R_p$ satisfies the CAPM equation exactly:

$$E(R_i) = R_f + \beta_{ip}[E(R_p) - R_f]\,$$.

(A portfolio is mean-variance efficient if there is no portfolio that has a higher return and lower risk than those for the efficient portfolio.) Mean-variance efficiency of the market portfolio is equivalent to the CAPM equation holding. This statement is a mathematical fact, requiring no model assumptions.

Given a proxy for the market portfolio, testing the CAPM equation is equivalent to testing mean-variance efficiency of the portfolio. The CAPM is tautological if the market is assumed to be mean-variance efficient.

2. The market portfolio is unobservable: The market portfolio in practice would necessarily include every single possible available asset, including real estate, precious metals, stamp collections, jewelry, and anything with any worth. The returns on all possible investments opportunities are unobservable.

From statement 1, validity of the CAPM is equivalent to the market being mean-variance efficient with respect to all investment opportunities. Without observing all investment opportunities, it is not possible to test whether this portfolio, or indeed any portfolio, is mean-variance efficient. Consequently, it is not possible to test the CAPM.

== Relationship to the APT ==
The mean-variance tautology argument applies to the arbitrage pricing theory and all asset-pricing models of the form

$$E(R_i) = \alpha+ \beta_{1}F_{1}+...+\beta_{N}F_{N}.\,$$

where $F_{1},...,F_{N}\,$ are unspecified factors. If the factors are returns on a mean-variance portfolio, the equation holds exactly.

It is always possible to identify in-sample mean-variance efficient portfolios within a dataset of returns. Consequently, it is also always possible to construct in-sample asset pricing models that exactly satisfy the above pricing equation. This is an example of data dredging.

== Discussion ==
Roll's critique has received a large number of citations in the financial economics literature, with tens of citations per year as of 2017–2019. The majority of these citations refer to the second statement of critique; few papers address the first statement. Many researchers and practitioners interpret Roll's critique as stating only that "the market portfolio is unobservable".
