= John H. Cochrane =

American economist

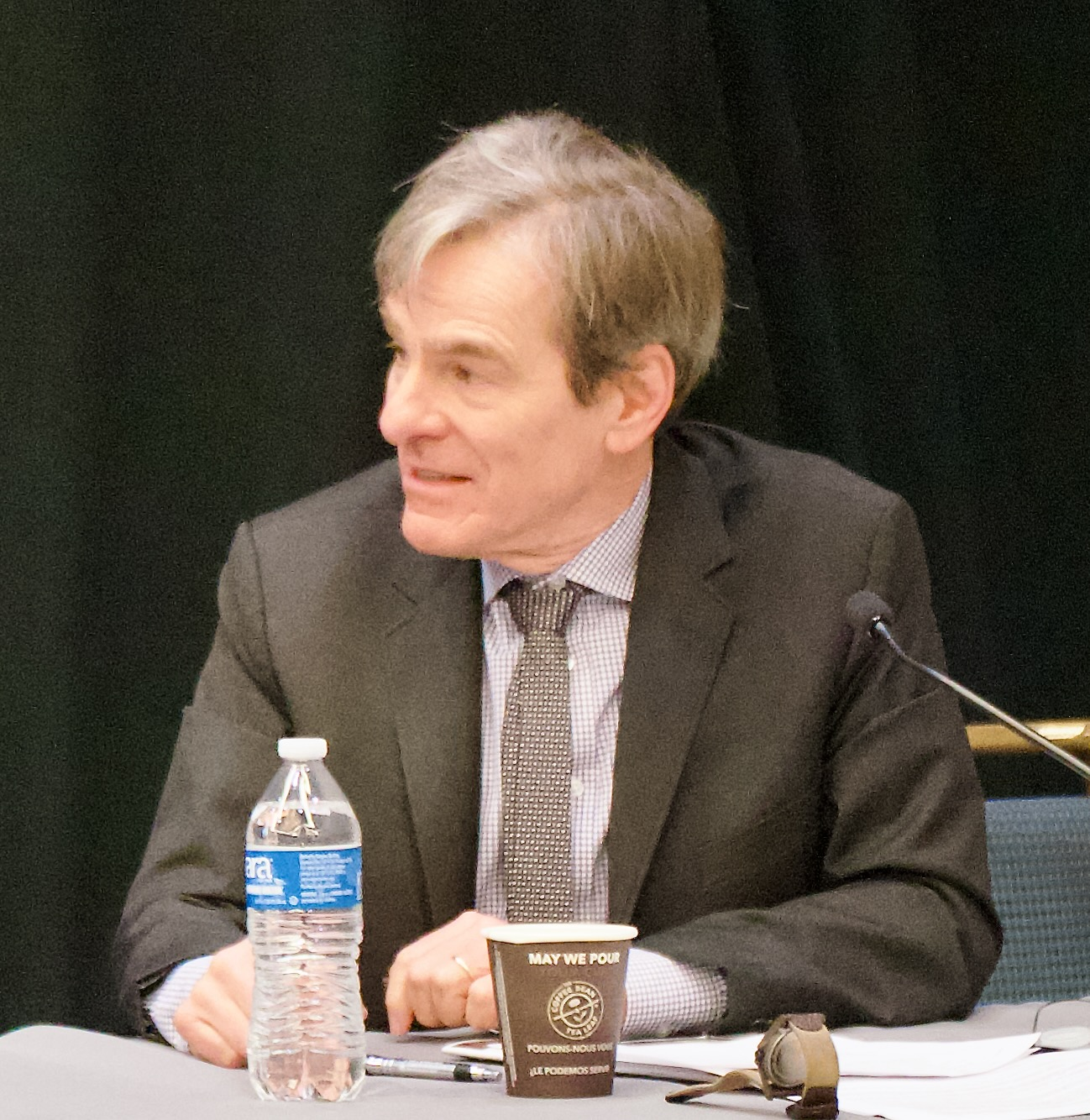
- Cochrane at AEA Annual Meeting in 2025
- Born: John Howland Cochrane; 26 November 1957 (age 68); Chicago, Illinois, U.S.
- Spouse: Elizabeth Fama

Academic background
- Education: Massachusetts Institute of Technology (BS); University of California, Berkeley (PhD)

Academic work
- Discipline: Financial economics Macroeconomics
- Institutions: Hoover Institution; Stanford Graduate School of Business; University of Chicago
- Website: johnhcochrane.com

John Howland Cochrane (/ˈkɒkrən/ KOK-rən; born 26 November 1957) is an American economist who has served as the Rose-Marie and Jack Anderson Senior Fellow at the Hoover Institution since 2015. A specialist in financial economics and macroeconomics, he has been a professor of finance and economics by courtesy at the Stanford Graduate School of Business since 2016. From 1994 to 2015, he served as the AQR Capital Management Distinguished Service Professor of Finance at the University of Chicago Booth School of Business.

== Life and career ==
Born in Chicago, Cochrane received a BS in physics from the Massachusetts Institute of Technology in 1979, and a PhD in economics from the University of California, Berkeley in 1986. From 1982 to 1983, he was a junior staff macroeconomist for the Council of Economic Advisers. In 1985, he became an assistant professor at the University of Chicago, and moved to the Booth School of Business in 1994, where he became the AQR Capital Management Distinguished Service Professor of Finance. He moved to the Hoover Institution at Stanford University in 2015, where he serves as the Rose-Marie and Jack Anderson Senior Fellow; he is also a professor of economics and finance by courtesy at the Stanford Graduate School of Business.

Cochrane has been a research associate at the NBER since 1998, and directed its Asset Pricing Program from 1998 to 2007. He was elected a Fellow of the Econometric Society in 2001, and edited the Journal of Political Economy from 1998 to 2003. From 2009 to 2010, he was President of the American Finance Association, on whose board of directors he served from 2003 to 2006.

=== Main contributions ===
The central idea of Cochrane's research is that macroeconomics and finance should be linked, and a comprehensive theory needs to explain both of the following:

- how, given the observed prices and financial returns, households and firms decide on consumption, investment, and financing.
- how, in equilibrium, prices and financial returns are determined by households and firms decisions.

This is standard general equilibrium logic, but many financial economists do not view it as a priority and prefer to explain prices without an ultimate reference to choices of households and firms. Similarly, many macroeconomists choose not to worry about asset prices.

In this vein, Cochrane's work has been to document some empirical patterns and offer some potential explanations. A 1999 JPE article he co-authored with John Y. Campbell develops a representative agent model with nonlinear habits that matches the high and volatile risk premium on stocks and the predictability of stock returns. In several articles (including one in the Journal of Finance in 1991, and the Journal of Political Economy in 1996), he develops and tests a "production-based asset pricing model" based on the q-theory of investment.

In two 1992 articles, Cochrane emphasized some features of asset prices which are difficult to account for, such as the predictability of equity returns, and the longterm equity premium. His more recent work, with Monika Piazzesi, studies bond markets. In particular, in a number of papers, Cochrane and Piazzesi study the predictability of bond returns. In recent blog posts and comments, Cochrane tends to focus more on inflation, debt, and the financial impacts brought by COVID-19. In a 2021 post called "Inflation, debt, politics, and insurance at Project Syndicate", Cochrane thinks that whether inflation surge is transitory or continuous or not depends on central banks and the government. If the government doesn't respond to inflation with joint fiscal and monetary stabilization policies, inflation will most likely erupt, and the economy will be in the shadow of debt and slow economic growth.

==== Fiscal theory of the price level ====
Cochrane's research from the mid-2010s up through to the present day incorporates a fiscal theory of the price level, or the theory that inflation is affected by more factors than simply the supply of money (a consensus that originally formed around the work of monetarist economist Milton Friedman).

Cochrane asserts that as governments and central banks accrue more debt, along with the general public losing confidence in that same government to pay the debt back, inflation is adversely affected. As long as governments incur debt and are able to pay the debt off in a timely manner, then inflation is not majorly realized in the form of consumer price increases across the board felt by consumers.

=== Other contributions ===
Cochrane has interests in diverse fields of economics, including asset markets, financial crisis and regulations, monetary and fiscal policies, and health insurance. Cochrane has worked on the fiscal theory of the price level, on the debate between permanent and temporary shocks in macroeconomic fluctuations, and the cost of near-rational behavior. Cochrane also developed an online class called "Asset Pricing" that is free and opens to anyone who is interested in learning more about this area. By registering through Canvas, students and faculty who intend to learn more about asset pricing will have the opportunities to take this class and complete relevant quizzes and exams.

== Asset Pricing ==
Cochrane is the author of Asset Pricing, a widely used textbook in graduate courses on asset pricing. According to his own words, the organizing principle of the book is that everything can be traced back to specializations of a single equation: the basic pricing equation. In 2001, Cochrane received the TIAA-CREF Institute's Paul A. Samuelson Award for the book.

== Media appearances ==
Cochrane appeared several times in the media after the 2008 financial crisis to discuss the economy. His blog The Grumpy Economist contains a series of news, views, and commentary, written from a “humorous free-market point of view”. With historian Niall Ferguson and former National Security Advisor H. R. McMaster he participates in the Hoover Institution’s weekly broadcast, Good Fellows - Conversations From The Hoover Institution.

Paul Krugman has repeatedly criticised Cochrane's viewpoints in The Grumpy Economist, both on his own blog, and in a 2009 New York Times article. Cochrane authored a response to Krugman's criticisms on his blog, which was subsequently published in the Wall Street Journal.

== Awards ==
- Fellow of the Econometric Society (2001)
- TIAA-CREF Institute's Paul A. Samuelson Award for Asset Pricing (2001)
- Honorary Doctorate from the University of St. Gallen (2014)
- Bradley Prize (2023)
- The Association of Private Enterprise Education Adam Smith Award (2024)

== Personal life ==
Cochrane's father, Eric, was a historian who specialised in the Renaissance, and taught Italian history at the University of Chicago; John Cochrane spent parts of his childhood in Florence, and speaks Italian. His mother, Lydia G. Cochrane (née Steinway), is an academic translator and French scholar. He is married to Elizabeth Fama, a PhD graduate of the University of Chicago, a young adult book author, and the daughter of noted financial economist Eugene Fama. They have four children.

Cochrane is a noted sailplane pilot who flew an ASW 27 with the callsign BB. Cochrane no longer flies an ASW 27, but still uses the callsign BB. He was a member of the US Team at the 2010 World Gliding Championships in Hungary.
