= Pietro Veronesi =

Pietro Veronesi is the Chicago Board of Trade Professor of Finance at the University of Chicago, Booth School of Business. He is also a research associate of the National Bureau of Economic Research and a research fellow of the Center for Economic and Policy Research. Additionally, he is a former director of the American Finance Association and co-editor of the Review of Financial Studies.

Veronesi conducts research that focuses on asset pricing, stock and bond valuation under uncertainty, bubbles and crashes, return predictability and stochastic volatility. Most recently, he has been interested in studying, both theoretically and empirically, the interaction between government interventions and the behavior of asset prices. His work has appeared in numerous publications, including the Journal of Political Economy, American Economic Review, Quarterly Journal of Economics, Journal of Finance, Journal of Financial Economics, and Review of Financial Studies. He is the recipient of several awards, including the 2015 AQR Insight award, the 2012 and 2003 Smith Breeden prizes from the Journal of Finance; the 2008 WFA award; the 2006 Barclays Global Investors Prize from the EFA; the 2006 Fama/DFA prizes from the Journal of Financial Economics; and the 1999 Barclays Global Investors/Michael Brennan First Prize from the Review of Financial Studies.

Veronesi teaches both master's- and PhD-level courses. He is the recipient of the 2009 McKinsey Award for Excellence in Teaching.

His undergraduate work was in economics at Bocconi University, where he graduated Magna cum laude in 1992. He earned a master's degree with distinction in 1993 from the London School of Economics. He joined the Chicago Booth faculty upon obtaining his PhD in economics from Harvard University in 1997.
