= Viral Acharya =

Indian economist (born 1974)

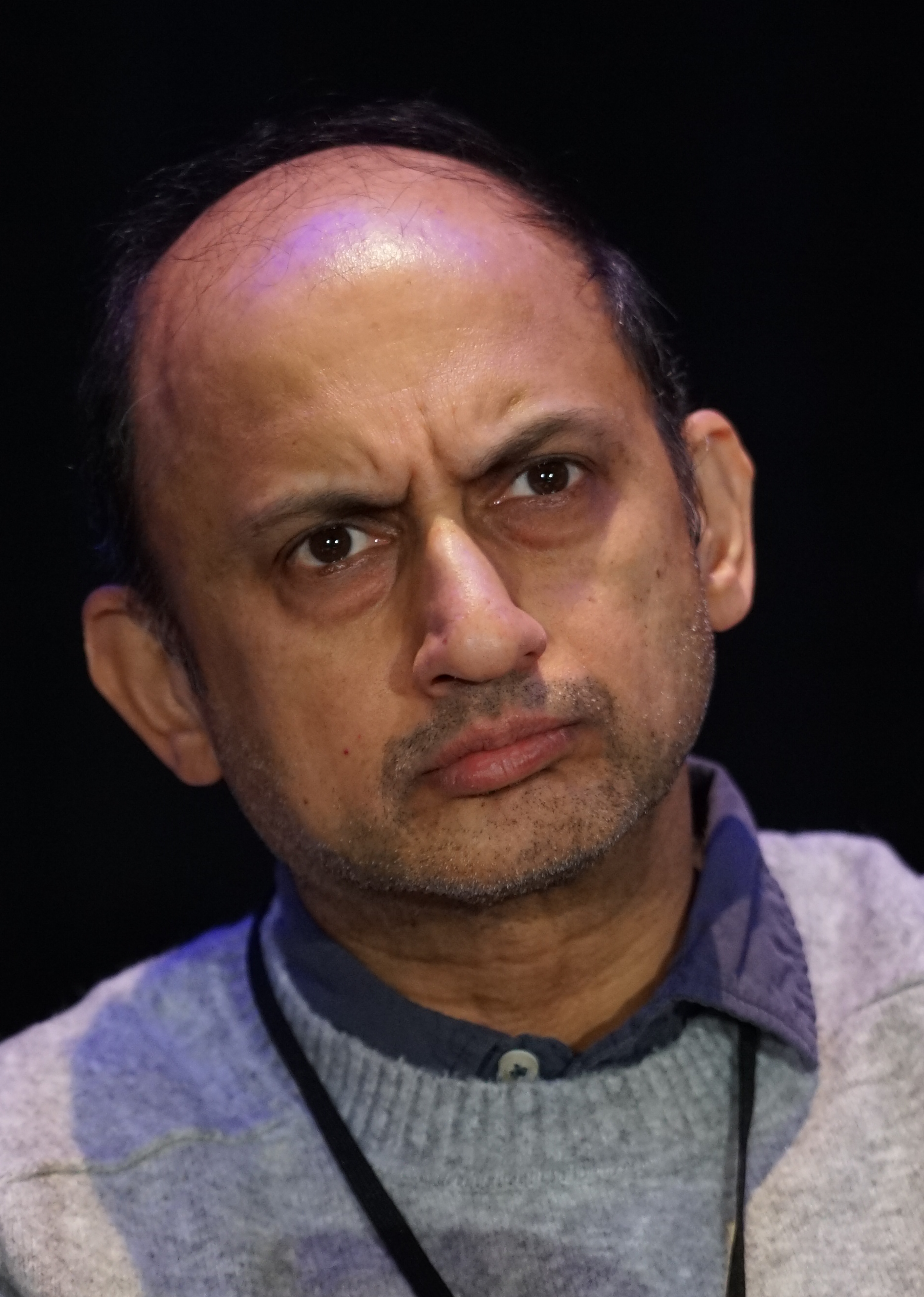
- Acharya at ASSA 2026

Deputy Governor of the Reserve Bank of India
- In office 23 January 2017 – 23 July 2019
- Governor: Urjit Patel; Shaktikanta Das
- Preceded by: Urjit Patel
- Succeeded by: Michael Patra

Personal details
- Born: 1 March 1974 (age 52)
- Education: IIT Bombay (B.Tech.); New York University (Ph.D.)
- Profession: Economist

Viral V. Acharya (born 1 March 1974) is an Indian economist who served as Deputy Governor of Reserve Bank of India (RBI) from 2017 to 2019. He is currently serving as the C.V. Starr Professor of Economics at New York University Stern School of Business. Previously he was also a member of the advisory council of the RBI Academy and was a member of the Academic Council of the National Institute of Securities Markets (NISM), Securities and Exchange Board of India (SEBI) since 2014. He resigned from the post in July 2019 with 6 months left for his completion of term.

== Biography ==
=== Education ===
He went to Fellowship High School, Mumbai. Acharya was ranked fifth nationally in 1991 in the Joint Entrance Examination on the basis of which admissions are made to the Indian Institutes of Technology in India. He graduated from the Indian Institute of Technology Bombay in 1995 with a Bachelor of Technology degree in Computer Science and Engineering, receiving the President of India Gold Medal for attaining the highest grade point average in his batch. In his final year at IIT Bombay, he enrolled in an elective in international finance. He initially joined the PhD program in computer science at New York University, but after a year switched to the PhD program in finance at New York University Stern School of Business. He graduated in 2001, with his dissertation thesis titled Essays in Banking and Financial Institutions.

=== Academic career ===
After obtaining his PhD, Acharya worked at the London Business School (LBS) from 2001 to 2008. Between 2007 and 2009, he was the Academic Director of the Coller Institute of Private Equity at the LBS. In 2008, he received a Houblon-Norman Senior Fellowship at the Bank of England. Since 2008, he is attached to the New York University Stern School of Business (NYU Stern), where he held the C.V. Starr Professor of Economics chair.

=== Reserve Bank of India ===
On 28 December 2016, Acharya was appointed by the Central Government of India as Deputy Governor of the Reserve Bank of India for a period of three years, starting on 20 January 2017. In June 2019, Viral Acharya quit as RBI Deputy Governor six months before end of his term.

== Personal life ==
He has composed a music album titled Yaadon Ke Silsile.

== Awards ==
Acharya is a recipient of the Alexandre Lamfalussy Senior Research Fellowship of the Bank for International Settlements for 2017, and the inaugural Banque de France and Toulouse School of Economics Junior Prize in Monetary Economics and Finance in 2011.

== Bibliography ==
=== Books ===
- Viral V. Acharya, Quest for Restoring Financial Stability in India, SAGE Publishing India, July 2020
- Viral V. Acharya, Thorsten Beck, Douglas D Evanoff, George G Kaufman and Richard Portes. World Scientific Studies in International Economics, 2013
- Viral V. Acharya, Thomas Cooley, Matthew Richardson and Ingo Walter. Dodd-Frank: One Year On. New York University Stern School of Business and CEPR ebook
- Viral V Acharya, Stijn van Nieuwerburgh, Matthew Richardson and Lawrence White. Guaranteed To Fail: Fannie Mae, Freddie Mac and the Debacle of Mortgage Finance. Princeton University Press, March 2011 ISBN 1-4008-3809-6
- Viral V. Acharya, Thomas Cooley, Matthew Richardson and Ingo Walter, editors. Regulating Wall Street: The Dodd-Frank Act and the New Architecture of Global Finance. John Wiley & Sons, November 2010
- Viral V. Acharya and Matthew Richardson. Restoring Financial Stability: How to Repair a Failed System. John Wiley & Sons, March 2009

== See also ==
- Indians in the New York City metropolitan region
