= Michael S. Weisbach =

American economist

Michael Steven Weisbach is an American economist, currently the Ralph W. Kurtz Chair in Finance at Ohio State University.
