= Center for Research in Security Prices =

Former provider of stock market data

Center for Research in Security Prices, LLC
- Trade name: Center for Research in Security Prices
- Industry: Financial services
- Founded: 1960; 66 years ago
- Founder: James H. Lorie; Lawrence Fisher
- Defunct: February 2, 2026; 7 months ago
- Fate: Acquired by Morningstar, Inc.
- Headquarters: Chicago, IL, USA
- Products: Stock market data Stock market indices
- Number of employees: 100–150

The Center for Research in Security Prices (CRSP, pronounced "crisp") was a provider of stock market data and stock market indices. In February 2026, the company was acquired by Morningstar, Inc.

== History ==
CRSP was founded in 1960 by James H. Lorie and Lawrence Fisher, professors at the University of Chicago, with a grant from Merrill. Its goal was to provide a source of accurate and comprehensive data that could be used to answer basic questions about the behavior of stock markets. The first effort was the production of a database consisting of monthly stock prices on the New York Stock Exchange for all common stocks from 1926 to 1962, including dividends, shares outstanding, capital changes, and delisting information. This data made possible the first comprehensive study of the rates of return on common stocks. This data was used to formulate the efficient markets hypothesis of Booth professor Eugene Fama, who in 2013 was awarded a Nobel Memorial Prize in Economic Sciences.

CRSP also developed the first market database that allowed investors to measure historic rates of return for U.S. stocks, broadening the appeal of equity ownership.

In January 2020, the university completed the corporate spin-off of CRSP, reorganizing it into an LLC wholly owned by the University of Chicago.

In February 2026, the company was acquired by Morningstar, Inc. for $375 million. At that time there was $3 trillion in assets tracking indices managed by CRSP and the company had annual revenue of $55 million. CRSP products were then rebranded under the Morningstar name.
