= Eugene Fama =

American economist (born 1939)

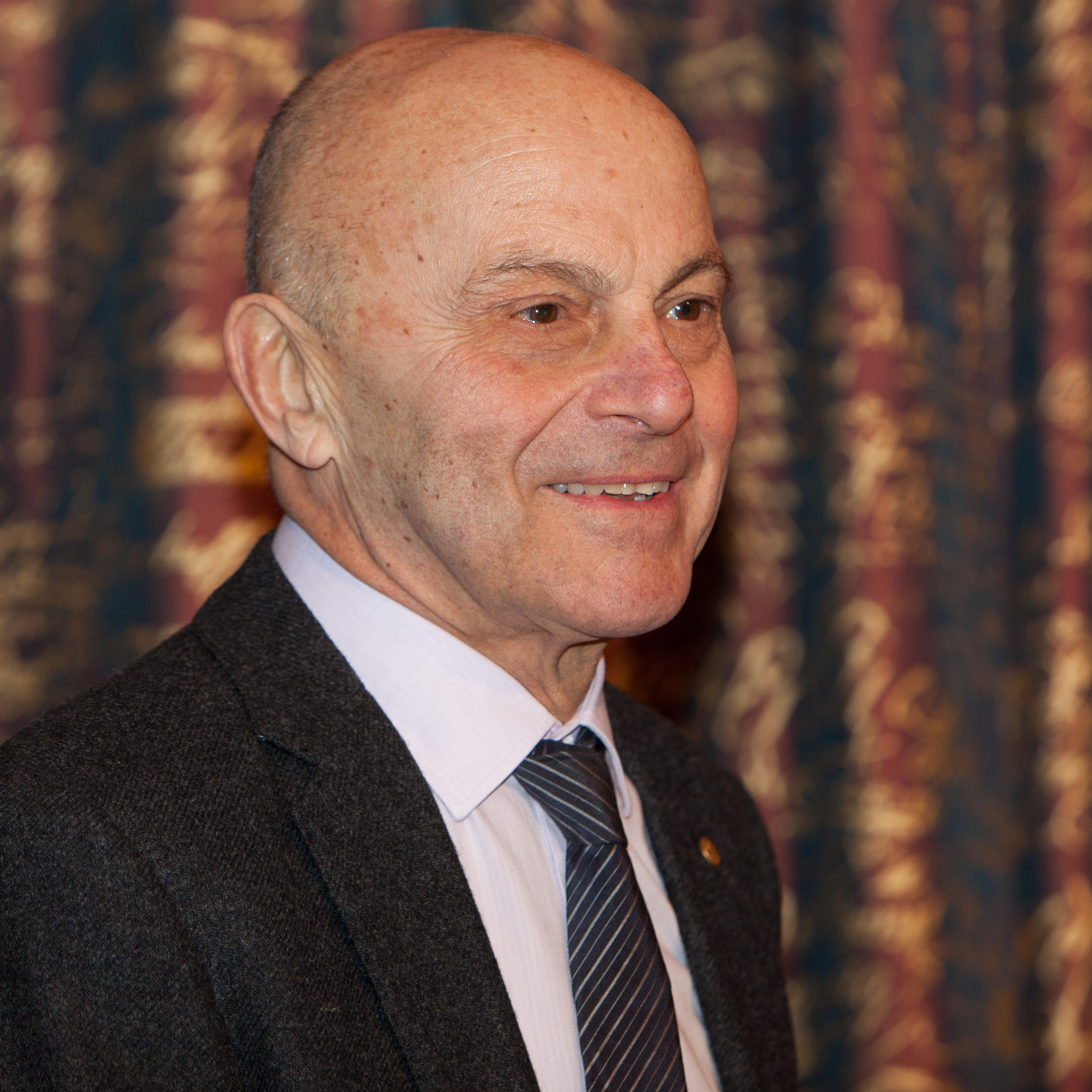
- Fama in 2013
- Born: February 14, 1939 (age 87); Boston, Massachusetts, U.S.

Academic background
- Education: Tufts University (BA); University of Chicago (MBA, PhD)
- Thesis: The Distribution of the Daily Differences of the Logarithms of Stock Prices (1964)
- Doctoral advisor: Merton Miller; Harry V. Roberts

Academic work
- Discipline: Financial economics, Organizational economics, Macroeconomics
- School or tradition: Chicago School of Economics
- Institutions: University of Chicago
- Doctoral students: Cliff Asness, Myron Scholes, Mark Carhart
- Notable ideas: Fama–French three-factor model Efficient-market hypothesis
- Awards: 2005 Deutsche Bank Prize in Financial Economics; 2008 Morgan Stanley-American Finance Association Award; Nobel Memorial Prize in Economics (2013)
- Website: Information at IDEAS / RePEc

Eugene Francis "Gene" Fama (/ˈfɑːmə/; born February 14, 1939) is an American economist, and Nobel Laureate, best known for his empirical work on portfolio theory, asset pricing, and the efficient-market hypothesis.

He is Robert R. McCormick Distinguished Service Professor of Finance at the University of Chicago Booth School of Business. In 2013, he shared the Nobel Memorial Prize in Economic Sciences jointly with Robert J. Shiller and Lars Peter Hansen. The Research Papers in Economics project ranked him as the 9th-most influential economist of all time based on his academic contributions, as of April 2019. He is regarded as "the father of modern finance", as his works built the foundation of financial economics and have been cited widely.

== Early life ==
Fama was born in Boston, Massachusetts, the son of Angelina (née Sarraceno) and Francis Fama. All of his grandparents were immigrants from Italy. Fama is a Malden Catholic High School Athletic Hall of Fame honoree. He earned his undergraduate degree in Romance Languages magna cum laude in 1960 from Tufts University, where he was also selected as the school's outstanding student–athlete.

== Graduate studies, career, and research ==
Fama's MBA and PhD came from the Booth School of Business at the University of Chicago in economics and finance. His doctoral supervisors were Nobel prize winner Merton Miller and Harry V. Roberts, but Benoit Mandelbrot was also an important influence. He has spent the entirety of his teaching career at the University of Chicago.

His PhD thesis, which concluded that short-term stock price movements are unpredictable and approximate a random walk, was published in the January 1965 issue of the Journal of Business, entitled "The Behavior of Stock Market Prices". That work was subsequently rewritten into a less technical article, "Random Walks In Stock Market Prices", which was published in the Financial Analysts Journal in 1965 and Institutional Investor in 1968. His later work with Kenneth French showed that predictability in expected stock returns can be explained by time-varying discount rates; for example, higher average returns during recessions can be explained by a systematic increase in risk aversion, which lowers prices and increases average returns. His article "The Adjustment of Stock Prices to New Information" in the International Economic Review, 1969 (with several co-authors) was the first event study that sought to analyze how stock prices respond to an event, using price data from the newly available CRSP database. This was the first of literally hundreds of such published studies.

Fama has served on the Board of Directors of money management firm Dimensional Fund Advisors since 1982. As of the end of 2024, DFA had $786 billion of assets under management.

In 2013, Fama, along with Lars Hansen and Robert Shiller, was awarded the Nobel Memorial Prize in Economic Sciences.

In 2019, the University of Chicago announced that one of the student houses of Woodlawn Residential Commons, which opened in 2020, would be named after Fama.

=== Efficient market hypothesis ===
Fama is most often thought of as the father of the efficient-market hypothesis, which began with his PhD thesis. In 1965 he published an analysis of the behavior of stock market prices that showed that they exhibited so-called fat tail distribution properties, implying extreme movements were more common than predicted on the assumption of normality.

In an article in the May 1970 issue of the Journal of Finance, entitled "Efficient Capital Markets: A Review of Theory and Empirical Work", Fama proposed two concepts that have been used on efficient markets ever since. First, Fama proposed three types of efficiency: (i) strong-form; (ii) semi-strong form; and (iii) weak efficiency. They are explained in the context of what information sets are factored in price trend. In weak form efficiency the information set is just historical prices, which can be predicted from historical price trend; thus, it is impossible to profit from it. Semi-strong form requires that all public information is reflected in prices already, such as companies' announcements or annual earnings figures. Finally, the strong-form concerns all information sets, including private information, are incorporated in price trend; it states no monopolistic information can entail profits, in other words, insider trading cannot make a profit in the strong-form market efficiency world. Second, Fama demonstrated that the notion of market efficiency could not be rejected without an accompanying rejection of the model of market equilibrium (e.g. the price setting mechanism). This concept, known as the "joint hypothesis problem", has ever since vexed researchers. Market efficiency denotes how information is factored in price, Fama (1970) emphasizes that the hypothesis of market efficiency must be tested in the context of expected returns. The joint hypothesis problem states that when a model yields a predicted return significantly different from the actual return, one can never be certain if there exists an imperfection in the model or if the market is inefficient. Researchers can only modify their models by adding different factors to eliminate any anomalies, in hopes of fully explaining the return within the model. The anomaly, also known as alpha in the modeling test, thus functions as a signal to the model maker whether it can perfectly predict returns by the factors in the model. However, as long as there exists an alpha, neither the conclusion of a flawed model nor market inefficiency can be drawn according to the Joint Hypothesis. Fama (1991) also stresses that market efficiency per se is not testable and can only be tested jointly with some model of equilibrium, i.e. an asset-pricing model.

=== Fama–French three-factor model ===
In recent decades, Fama has continued to write influential papers, most of which have been co-written with Kenneth French, that challenge the validity of the Capital Asset Pricing Model (CAPM), which posits that a stock's beta alone should explain its average return. These papers describe two factors in addition to a stock's market beta which can explain differences in stock returns: market capitalization and relative price. They also offer evidence that a variety of patterns in average returns, often labeled as "anomalies" in past work, can be explained with their Fama–French three-factor model. The model introduced in this 1993 article rapidly became a standard benchmark in academic papers for evaluating portfolio performance. The three factor model used returns on the market, value (measured using book value of equity-to-market value of equity), and size (market cap) to explain portfolio returns. In 2015, they added two more factors, a profitability factor and an investment factor, to create a five-factor model.

=== Economic bubbles ===
Fama has expressed skepticism about the notion that economic bubbles can be identified. He argues that for something to be a bubble, its ending needs to be predicted in real time, not just after the fact. He argues that conventional rhetoric about bubbles proposes no testable propositions and no ways to measure a bubble.

Fama has been skeptical about the long-term viability of bitcoin, citing its extreme volatility, lack of intrinsic value, and violation of basic monetary principles.

== Bibliography ==
- The Theory of Finance, Dryden Press, 1972
- Foundations of Finance: Portfolio Decisions and Securities Prices, Basic Books, 1976
- The Fama Portfolio: Selected Papers of Eugene F. Fama, edited by John H. Cochrane and Toby Moskowitz, University of Chicago Press, 2017

Awards
Preceded by Alvin E. Roth; Lloyd S. Shapley	Laureate of the Nobel Memorial Prize in Economics; 2013; Served alongside: Lars Peter Hansen, Robert J. Shiller	Succeeded by Jean Tirole
