= Information society =

Society driven by the processing and communication of information

An information society is a society or subculture in which the usage, creation, distribution, manipulation, and integration of information is a significant activity. Its main drivers are information and communication technologies, which have resulted in rapid growth of a variety of forms of information. Proponents of this theory posit that these technologies are impacting the most important forms of social organization, including education, the economy, health, government, warfare, and levels of democracy. The people who are able to partake in this form of society are sometimes called either computer users or even digital citizens, defined by K. Mossberger as “Those who use the Internet regularly and effectively”. This is one of many dozen internet terms that have been identified to suggest that humans are entering a new and different phase of society.

Some of the markers of this steady change may be technological, economic, occupational, spatial, cultural, or a combination of all of these. Information society is seen as a successor to industrial society. Concepts that are closely related include the post-industrial society (post-fordism), post-modern society, computer society and knowledge society, telematic society, society of the spectacle (postmodernism), the Information Revolution and the Information Age, network society (Manuel Castells), and even liquid modernity (Zygmunt Bauman).

== Definition ==
There is currently no universally accepted concept of what exactly can be defined as an information society and what shall not be included in the term. Most theoreticians agree that a transformation can be seen as started somewhere between the 1970s, the early 1990s transformations of the Eastern Bloc nations from socialist to capitalist economies and the 2000s period that formed most of today's net principles and currently as is changing the way societies work fundamentally. Information technology goes beyond the internet, as the principles of internet design and usage influence other areas, and there are discussions about how big the influence of specific media or specific modes of production really is. Frank Webster notes five major types of information that can be used to define information society: technological, economic, occupational, spatial and cultural. According to Webster, the character of information has transformed the way that we live today. How we conduct ourselves centers around theoretical knowledge and information.

Kasiwulaya and Gomo (Makerere University) allude that information societies are those that have intensified their use of IT for economic, social, cultural and political transformation. In 2005, governments reaffirmed their dedication to the foundations of the Information Society in the Tunis Commitment and outlined the basis for implementation and follow-up in the Tunis Agenda for the Information Society. In particular, the Tunis Agenda addresses the issues of financing of ICTs for development and Internet governance that could not be resolved in the first phase.

Some people, such as Antonio Negri, characterize the information society as one in which people do immaterial labour. By this, they appear to refer to the production of knowledge or cultural artifacts. One problem with this model is that it ignores the material and essentially industrial basis of the society. However it does point to a problem for workers, namely how many creative people does this society need to function? For example, it may be that you only need a few star performers, rather than a plethora of non-celebrities, as the work of those performers can be easily distributed, forcing all secondary players to the bottom of the market. It is now common for publishers to promote only their best selling authors and to try to avoid the rest—even if they still sell steadily. Films are becoming more and more judged, in terms of distribution, by their first weekend's performance, in many cases cutting out opportunity for word-of-mouth development.

Michael Buckland characterizes information in society in his book Information and Society. Buckland expresses the idea that information can be interpreted differently from person to person based on that individual's experiences. Most of the meanings of the word information fall into three categories: information as knowledge, information as a process, and information as a thing. Thus, the term information society refers to the social importance given to communication and information in today's society, where social, economic and cultural relations are involved. In the information society, the process of capturing, processing and communicating information is the main element that characterizes it. Thus, in this type of society, the vast majority of it will be dedicated to the provision of services and said services will consist of the processing, distribution or use of information.

Considering that metaphors and technologies of information move forward in a reciprocal relationship, we can describe some societies (especially the Japanese society) as an information society because we think of it as such.

== The growth of computer information in society ==
Internet users per 100 inhabitants Source: International Telecommunication Union.

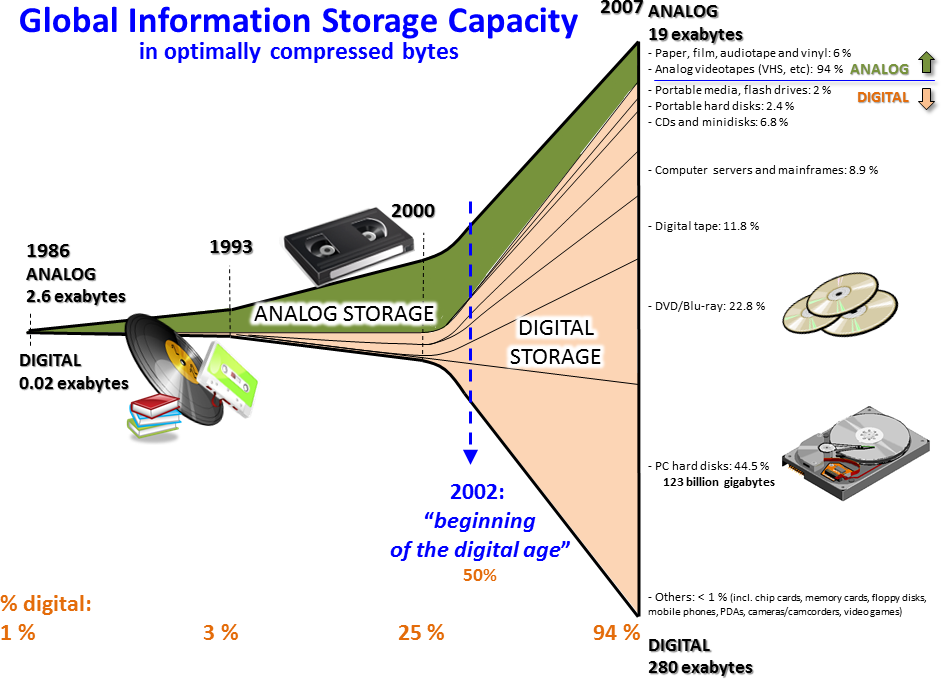
The amount of data stored globally has increased greatly since the 1980s, and by 2007, 94% of it was stored digitally. Source

The growth of the amount of technologically mediated information has been quantified in different ways, including society's technological capacity to store information, to communicate information, and to compute information. It is estimated that, the world's technological capacity to store information grew from 2.6 (optimally compressed) exabytes in 1986, which is the informational equivalent to less than one 730-MB CD-ROM per person in 1986 (539 MB per person), to 295 (optimally compressed) exabytes in 2007. This is the informational equivalent of 60 CD-ROM per person in 2007 and represents a sustained annual growth rate of some 25%. The world's combined technological capacity to receive information through one-way broadcast networks was the informational equivalent of 174 newspapers per person per day in 2007.

The world's combined effective capacity to exchange information through two-way telecommunications networks was 281 petabytes of (optimally compressed) information in 1986, 471 petabytes in 1993, 2.2 (optimally compressed) exabytes in 2000, and 65 (optimally compressed) exabytes in 2007, which is the informational equivalent of 6 newspapers per person per day in 2007. The world's technological capacity to compute information with humanly guided general-purpose computers grew from 3.0×10^{8} MIPS in 1986, to 6.4×10^{12} MIPS in 2007, experiencing the fastest growth rate of over 60% per year during the last two decades.

James R. Beniger describes the necessity of information in modern society in the following way: “The need for sharply increased control that resulted from the industrialization of material processes through application of inanimate sources of energy probably accounts for the rapid development of automatic feedback technology in the early industrial period (1740-1830)” (p. 174) “Even with enhanced feedback control, industry could not have developed without the enhanced means to process matter and energy, not only as inputs of the raw materials of production but also as outputs distributed to final consumption.”(p. 175)

== Development of the information society model ==
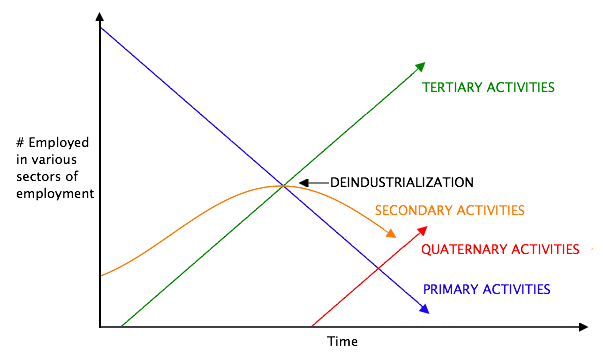
Colin Clark's sector model of an economy undergoing technological change. In later stages, the Quaternary sector of the economy grows.

One of the first people to develop the concept of the information society was the economist Fritz Machlup. In 1933, Fritz Machlup began studying the effect of patents on research. His work culminated in the study The production and distribution of knowledge in the United States in 1962. This book was widely regarded and was eventually translated into Russian and Japanese. The Japanese have also studied the information society (or jōhōka shakai, 情報化社会).

The issue of technologies and their role in contemporary society have been discussed in the scientific literature using a range of labels and concepts. This section introduces some of them. Ideas of a knowledge or information economy, post-industrial society, postmodern society, network society, the information revolution, informational capitalism, network capitalism, and the like, have been debated over the last several decades.

Fritz Machlup (1962) introduced the concept of the knowledge industry. He began studying the effects of patents on research before distinguishing five sectors of the knowledge sector: education, research and development, mass media, information technologies, information services. Based on this categorization he calculated that in 1959 29% per cent of the GNP in the USA had been produced in knowledge industries.

=== Digital Divide ===
A central issue in the information society is the digital divide, which refers to the unequal distribution of access to, use of, and benefits derived from information and communication technologies (ICTs) across different populations. The concept emerged in the mid-1990s and has evolved from a narrow focus on physical access to computers and the Internet into a broader framework. Jan van Dijk distinguishes three levels of digital inequality: a first level concerning material access to devices and connectivity; a second level covering differences in digital skills and patterns of use; and a third level related to the social, economic, and political outcomes that individuals obtain from their use of digital technologies.

Pippa Norris offers a complementary classification based on geographic and political dimensions. She identifies a global divide (differences in Internet access between industrialized and developing countries), a social divide (inequalities between socioeconomic groups within a single country), and a democratic divide (the gap between those who do and do not use digital resources for civic and political participation). This framework shows that unequal access to ICTs not only reflects existing economic stratification but also has consequences for democratic participation and political representation in the information society.

Empirical data illustrate the scale of the problem. According to the International Telecommunication Union, in 2024 approximately 5.5 billion people—68 per cent of the world's population—were using the Internet. However, penetration rates varied sharply by income level: 93 per cent in high-income countries compared with only 27 per cent in low-income countries. Significant gaps also persist along gender lines and between urban and rural areas, particularly in developing countries. The ITU's 2025 edition notes that while nearly three-quarters of the global population are now online, progress has slowed and 2.2 billion people remain without Internet access.

Several scholars have argued that the digital divide is not only a technological problem but a reflection of deeper structural inequalities. Ellen Helsper's corresponding fields model shows that disadvantages in offline domains—economic, cultural, social, and personal—translate systematically into disadvantages in digital participation. Similarly, Van Dijk argues that digital inequality tends to reinforce existing social inequalities, as those with greater resources are better positioned to acquire skills, gain quality access, and turn Internet use into favorable outcomes. This perspective challenges the optimistic view that the spread of ICTs would automatically democratize access to information and opportunities.

The digital divide has been a key focus of international policy. The World Summit on the Information Society (WSIS), held in Geneva in 2003 and Tunis in 2005, established a global framework aimed at reducing ICT disparities between the Global North and South, with emphasis on infrastructure investment, affordability, and digital literacy. The continuing relevance of the issue is reflected in its alignment with the United Nations Sustainable Development Goals, particularly Goal 9 on industry, innovation, and infrastructure.

=== Economic transition ===
Peter Drucker has argued that there is a transition from an economy based on material goods to one based on knowledge. Marc Porat distinguishes a primary (information goods and services that are directly used in the production, distribution or processing of information) and a secondary sector (information services produced for internal consumption by government and non-information firms) of the information economy.

Porat uses the total value added by the primary and secondary information sector to the GNP as an indicator for the information economy. The OECD has employed Porat's definition for calculating the share of the information economy in the total economy (e.g. OECD 1981, 1986). Based on such indicators, the information society has been defined as a society where more than half of the GNP is produced and more than half of the employees are active in the information economy.

For Daniel Bell the number of employees producing services and information is an indicator for the informational character of a society. "A post-industrial society is based on services. (…) What counts is not raw muscle power, or energy, but information. (…) A post industrial society is one in which the majority of those employed are not involved in the production of tangible goods".

Alain Touraine already spoke in 1971 of the post-industrial society. "The passage to postindustrial society takes place when investment results in the production of symbolic goods that modify values, needs, representations, far more than in the production of material goods or even of 'services'. Industrial society had transformed the means of production: post-industrial society changes the ends of production, that is, culture. (…) The decisive point here is that in postindustrial society all of the economic system is the object of intervention of society upon itself. That is why we can call it the programmed society, because this phrase captures its capacity to create models of management, production, organization, distribution, and consumption, so that such a society appears, at all its functional levels, as the product of an action exercised by the society itself, and not as the outcome of natural laws or cultural specificities" (Touraine 1988: 104). In the programmed society also the area of cultural reproduction including aspects such as information, consumption, health, research, education would be industrialized. That modern society is increasing its capacity to act upon itself means for Touraine that society is reinvesting ever larger parts of production and so produces and transforms itself. This makes Touraine's concept substantially different from that of Daniel Bell who focused on the capacity to process and generate information for efficient society functioning.

Jean-François Lyotard has argued that "knowledge has become the principle [sic] force of production over the last few decades". Knowledge would be transformed into a commodity. Lyotard says that postindustrial society makes knowledge accessible to the layman because knowledge and information technologies would diffuse into society and break up Grand Narratives of centralized structures and groups. Lyotard denotes these changing circumstances as postmodern condition or postmodern society.

Similarly to Bell, Peter Otto and Philipp Sonntag (1985) say that an information society is a society where the majority of employees work in information jobs, i.e. they have to deal more with information, signals, symbols, and images than with energy and matter. Radovan Richta (1977) argues that society has been transformed into a scientific civilization based on services, education, and creative activities. This transformation would be the result of a scientific-technological transformation based on technological progress and the increasing importance of computer technology. Science and technology would become immediate forces of production (Aristovnik 2014: 55).

Nico Stehr (1994, 2002a, b) says that in the knowledge society a majority of jobs involves working with knowledge. "Contemporary society may be described as a knowledge society based on the extensive penetration of all its spheres of life and institutions by scientific and technological knowledge" (Stehr 2002b: 18). For Stehr, knowledge is a capacity for social action. Science would become an immediate productive force, knowledge would no longer be primarily embodied in machines, but already appropriated nature that represents knowledge would be rearranged according to certain designs and programs (Ibid.: 41-46). For Stehr, the economy of a knowledge society is largely driven not by material inputs, but by symbolic or knowledge-based inputs (Ibid.: 67), there would be a large number of professions that involve working with knowledge, and a declining number of jobs that demand low cognitive skills as well as in manufacturing (Stehr 2002a).

Also Alvin Toffler argues that knowledge is the central resource in the economy of the information society: "In a Third Wave economy, the central resource – a single word broadly encompassing data, information, images, symbols, culture, ideology, and values – is actionable knowledge" (Dyson/Gilder/Keyworth/Toffler 1994).

At the end of the twentieth century, the concept of the network society gained importance in information society theory. For Manuel Castells, network logic is besides information, pervasiveness, flexibility, and convergence a central feature of the information technology paradigm (2000a: 69ff). "One of the key features of informational society is the networking logic of its basic structure, which explains the use of the concept of 'network society'" (Castells 2000: 21). "As an historical trend, dominant functions and processes in the Information Age are increasingly organized around networks. Networks constitute the new social morphology of our societies, and the diffusion of networking logic substantially modifies the operation and outcomes in processes of production, experience, power, and culture" (Castells 2000: 500). For Castells the network society is the result of informationalism, a new technological paradigm.

Jan Van Dijk (2006) defines the network society as a "social formation with an infrastructure of social and media networks enabling its prime mode of organization at all levels (individual, group/organizational and societal). Increasingly, these networks link all units or parts of this formation (individuals, groups and organizations)" (Van Dijk 2006: 20). For Van Dijk networks have become the nervous system of society, whereas Castells links the concept of the network society to capitalist transformation, Van Dijk sees it as the logical result of the increasing widening and thickening of networks in nature and society. Darin Barney uses the term for characterizing societies that exhibit two fundamental characteristics: "The first is the presence in those societies of sophisticated – almost exclusively digital – technologies of networked communication and information management/distribution, technologies which form the basic infrastructure mediating an increasing array of social, political and economic practices. (…) The second, arguably more intriguing, characteristic of network societies is the reproduction and institutionalization throughout (and between) those societies of networks as the basic form of human organization and relationship across a wide range of social, political and economic configurations and associations".

=== Critiques ===
The major critique of concepts such as information society, postmodern society, knowledge society, network society, postindustrial society, etc. that has mainly been voiced by critical scholars is that they create the impression that we have entered a completely new type of society. "If there is just more information then it is hard to understand why anyone should suggest that we have before us something radically new" (Webster 2002a: 259). Critics such as Frank Webster argue that these approaches stress discontinuity, as if contemporary society had nothing in common with society as it was 100 or 150 years ago. Such assumptions would have ideological character because they would fit with the view that we can do nothing about change and have to adapt to existing political realities (kasiwulaya 2002b: 267).

These critics argue that contemporary society first of all is still a capitalist society oriented towards accumulating economic, political, and cultural capital. They acknowledge that information society theories stress some important new qualities of society (notably globalization and informatization), but charge that they fail to show that these are attributes of overall capitalist structures. Critics such as Webster insist on the continuities that characterise change. In this way Webster distinguishes between different epochs of capitalism: laissez-faire capitalism of the 19th century, corporate capitalism in the 20th century, and informational capitalism for the 21st century (kasiwulaya 2006).

For describing contemporary society based on a new dialectic of continuity and discontinuity, other critical scholars have suggested several terms like:

- transnational network capitalism, transnational informational capitalism (Christian Fuchs 2008, 2007): "Computer networks are the technological foundation that has allowed the emergence of global network capitalism, that is, regimes of accumulation, regulation, and discipline that are helping to increasingly base the accumulation of economic, political, and cultural capital on transnational network organizations that make use of cyberspace and other new technologies for global coordination and communication. [...] The need to find new strategies for executing corporate and political domination has resulted in a restructuration of capitalism that is characterized by the emergence of transnational, networked spaces in the economic, political, and cultural system and has been mediated by cyberspace as a tool of global coordination and communication. Economic, political, and cultural space have been restructured; they have become more fluid and dynamic, have enlarged their borders to a transnational scale, and handle the inclusion and exclusion of nodes in flexible ways. These networks are complex due to the high number of nodes (individuals, enterprises, teams, political actors, etc.) that can be involved and the high speed at which a high number of resources is produced and transported within them. But global network capitalism is based on structural inequalities; it is made up of segmented spaces in which central hubs (transnational corporations, certain political actors, regions, countries, Western lifestyles, and worldviews) centralize the production, control, and flows of economic, political, and cultural capital (property, power, definition capacities). This segmentation is an expression of the overall competitive character of contemporary society." (Fuchs 2008: 110+119).
- digital capitalism (Schiller 2000, cf. also Peter Glotz): "networks are directly generalizing the social and cultural range of the capitalist economy as never before" (Schiller 2000: xiv)
- virtual capitalism: the "combination of marketing and the new information technology will enable certain firms to obtain higher profit margins and larger market shares, and will thereby promote greater concentration and centralization of capital" (Dawson/John Bellamy Foster 1998: 63sq),
- high-tech capitalism or informatic capitalism (Fitzpatrick 2002) – to focus on the computer as a guiding technology that has transformed the productive forces of capitalism and has enabled a globalized economy.

Other scholars prefer to speak of information capitalism (Morris-Suzuki 1997) or informational capitalism (Manuel Castells 2000, Christian Fuchs 2005, Schmiede 2006a, b). Manuel Castells sees informationalism as a new technological paradigm (he speaks of a mode of development) characterized by "information generation, processing, and transmission" that have become "the fundamental sources of productivity and power" (Castells 2000: 21). The "most decisive historical factor accelerating, channelling and shaping the information technology paradigm, and inducing its associated social forms, was/is the process of capitalist restructuring undertaken since the 1980s, so that the new techno-economic system can be adequately characterized as informational capitalism" (Castells 2000: 18). Castells has added to theories of the information society the idea that in contemporary society dominant functions and processes are increasingly organized around networks that constitute the new social morphology of society (Castells 2000: 500). Nicholas Garnham is critical of Castells and argues that the latter's account is technologically determinist because Castells points out that his approach is based on a dialectic of technology and society in which technology embodies society and society uses technology (Castells 2000: 5sqq). But Castells also makes clear that the rise of a new "mode of development" is shaped by capitalist production, i.e. by society, which implies that technology isn't the only driving force of society.

Antonio Negri and Michael Hardt argue that contemporary society is an Empire that is characterized by a singular global logic of capitalist domination that is based on immaterial labour. With the concept of immaterial labour Negri and Hardt introduce ideas of information society discourse into their Marxist account of contemporary capitalism. Immaterial labour would be labour "that creates immaterial products, such as knowledge, information, communication, a relationship, or an emotional response" (Hardt/Negri 2005: 108; cf. also 2000: 280-303), or services, cultural products, knowledge (Hardt/Negri 2000: 290). There would be two forms: intellectual labour that produces ideas, symbols, codes, texts, linguistic figures, images, etc.; and affective labour that produces and manipulates affects such as a feeling of ease, well-being, satisfaction, excitement, passion, joy, sadness, etc. (Ibid.).

Overall, neo-Marxist accounts of the information society have in common that they stress that knowledge, information technologies, and computer networks have played a role in the restructuration and globalization of capitalism and the emergence of a flexible regime of accumulation (David Harvey 1989). They warn that new technologies are embedded into societal antagonisms that cause structural unemployment, rising poverty, social exclusion, the deregulation of the welfare state and of labour rights, the lowering of wages, welfare, etc.

Concepts such as knowledge society, information society, network society, informational capitalism, postindustrial society, transnational network capitalism, postmodern society, etc. show that there is a vivid discussion in contemporary sociology on the character of contemporary society and the role that technologies, information, communication, and co-operation play in it. Information society theory discusses the role of information and information technology in society, the question which key concepts shall be used for characterizing contemporary society, and how to define such concepts. It has become a specific branch of contemporary sociology.

== Second and third nature ==
Information society is the means of sending and receiving information from one place to another. As technology has advanced so too has the way people have adapted in sharing information with each other.

"Second nature" refers a group of experiences that get made over by culture. They then get remade into something else that can then take on a new meaning. As a society we transform this process so it becomes something natural to us, i.e. second nature. So, by following a particular pattern created by culture we are able to recognise how we use and move information in different ways. From sharing information via different time zones (such as talking online) to information ending up in a different location (sending a letter overseas) this has all become a habitual process that we as a society take for granted.

However, through the process of sharing information vectors have enabled us to spread information even further. Through the use of these vectors information is able to move and then separate from the initial things that enabled them to move. From here, something called "third nature" has developed. An extension of second nature, third nature is in control of second nature. It expands on what second nature is limited by. It has the ability to mould information in new and different ways. So, third nature is able to ‘speed up, proliferate, divide, mutate, and beam in on us from elsewhere. It aims to create a balance between the boundaries of space and time (see second nature). This can be seen through the telegraph, it was the first successful technology that could send and receive information faster than a human being could move an object. As a result different vectors of people have the ability to not only shape culture but create new possibilities that will ultimately shape society.

Therefore, through the use of second nature and third nature society is able to use and explore new vectors of possibility where information can be moulded to create new forms of interaction.

== Sociological uses ==
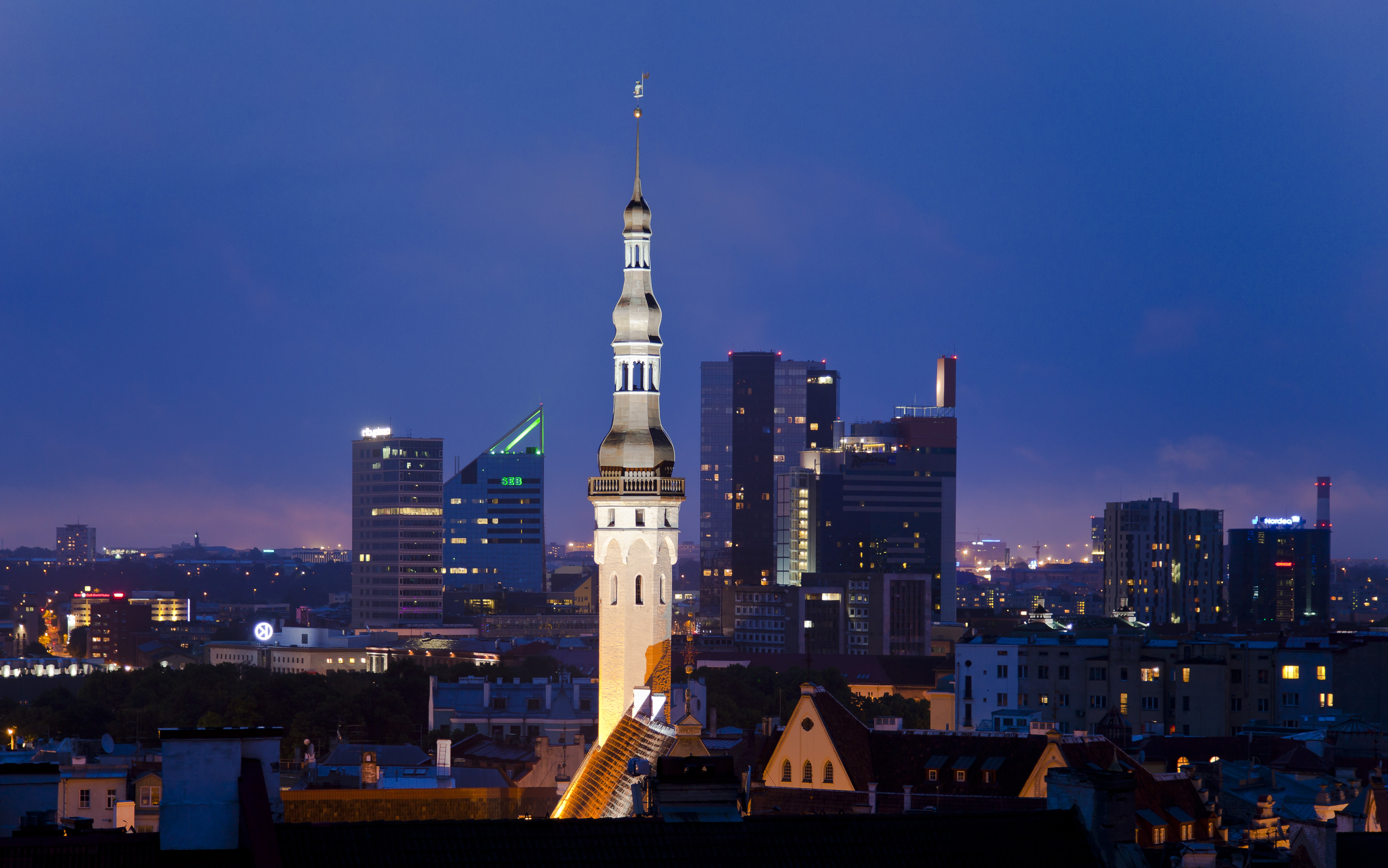
Estonia, a small Baltic country in northern Europe, is one of the most advanced digital societies.

In sociology, informational society refers to a post-modern type of society. Theoreticians like Ulrich Beck, Anthony Giddens and Manuel Castells argue that since the 1970s a transformation from industrial society to informational society has happened on a global scale.

As steam power was the technology standing behind industrial society, so information technology is seen as the catalyst for the changes in work organisation, societal structure and politics occurring in the late 20th century.

In the book Future Shock, Alvin Toffler used the phrase super-industrial society to describe this type of society. Other writers and thinkers have used terms like "post-industrial society" and "post-modern industrial society" with a similar meaning.

== Related terms ==
A number of terms in current use emphasize related but different aspects of the emerging global economic order. The Information Society intends to be the most encompassing in that an economy is a subset of a society. The Information Age is somewhat limiting, in that it refers to a 30-year period between the widespread use of computers and the knowledge economy, rather than an emerging economic order. The knowledge era is about the nature of the content, not the socioeconomic processes by which it will be traded. The computer revolution, and knowledge revolution refer to specific revolutionary transitions, rather than the end state towards which we are evolving. The Information Revolution relates with the well-known terms agricultural revolution and Industrial Revolution.

- The information economy and the knowledge economy emphasize the content or intellectual property that is being traded through an information market or knowledge market, respectively. Electronic commerce and electronic business emphasize the nature of transactions and running a business, respectively, using the Internet and World-Wide Web. The digital economy focuses on trading bits in cyberspace rather than atoms in physical space. The network economy stresses that businesses will work collectively in webs or as part of business ecosystems rather than as stand-alone units. Social networking refers to the process of collaboration on massive, global scales. The internet economy focuses on the nature of markets that are enabled by the Internet.
- Knowledge services and knowledge value put content into an economic context. Knowledge services integrates Knowledge management, within a Knowledge organization, that trades in a Knowledge market. In order for individuals to receive more knowledge, surveillance is used. This relates to the use of Drones as a tool in order to gather knowledge on other individuals. Although seemingly synonymous, each term conveys more than nuances or slightly different views of the same thing. Each term represents one attribute of the likely nature of economic activity in the emerging post-industrial society. Alternatively, the new economic order will incorporate all of the above plus other attributes that have not yet fully emerged.
- In connection with the development of the information society, information pollution appeared, which in turn evolved information ecology – associated with information hygiene.

== Intellectual property considerations ==
One of the central paradoxes of the information society is that it makes information easily reproducible, leading to a variety of freedom/control problems relating to intellectual property. Essentially, business and capital, whose place becomes that of producing and selling information and knowledge, seems to require control over this new resource so that it can effectively be managed and sold as the basis of the information economy. However, such control can prove to be both technically and socially problematic. Technically because copy protection is often easily circumvented and socially rejected because the users and citizens of the information society can prove to be unwilling to accept such absolute commodification of the facts and information that compose their environment.

Responses to this concern range from the Digital Millennium Copyright Act in the United States (and similar legislation elsewhere) which make copy protection (see Digital rights management) circumvention illegal, to the free software, open source and copyleft movements, which seek to encourage and disseminate the "freedom" of various information products (traditionally both as in "gratis" or free of cost, and liberty, as in freedom to use, explore and share).

Caveat: Information society is often used by politicians meaning something like "we all do internet now"; the sociological term information society (or informational society) has some deeper implications about change of societal structure. Because we lack political control of intellectual property, we are lacking in a concrete map of issues, an analysis of costs and benefits, and functioning political groups that are unified by common interests representing different opinions of this diverse situation that are prominent in the information society.

== See also ==
- Cyberspace
- Digitization
- Digital transformation
- Digital dark age
- Digital addict
- Digital phobic
- Information culture
- Information history
- Information industry
- Information revolution
- Internet culture
- Netizen
- Network society
- Simon Buckingham and unorganisation
- Social Age
- Surveillance capitalism
- The Information Society (journal)
- World Summit on the Information Society (WSIS)
- Yoneji Masuda
