= Michele Sorice =

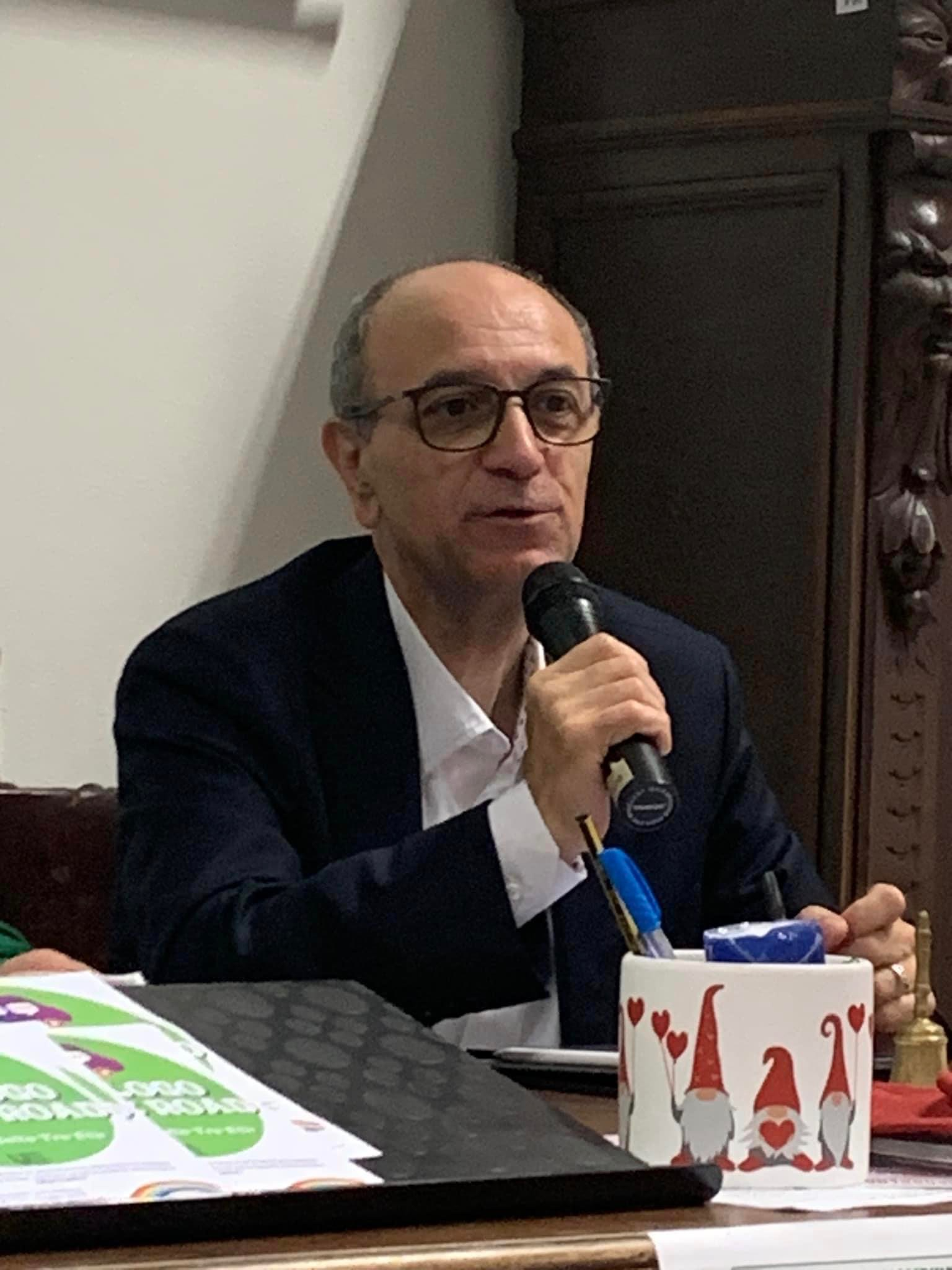
- Born: May 1, 1961 (age 64)
- Occupations: Sociologist and Political Scientist
- Known for: Critical Media Studies, Political Communication, Political Sociology, Participatory Deliberative Democracy, Democratic Innovations

Michele Sorice (born 1 May 1961) is an Italian sociologist and political scientist known for his work in the fields of political communication, political science and critical media studies. He is the author of over 30 books, 60 articles and 90 chapters in edited books.

== Work ==
Two stages can be identified in Sorice's academic life. In the first stage, Sorice outlined a new vision of the interrelationships between media studies and consumption theories, in the frame of the critical media studies. His publications during this time include Logiche dell'illogico (1995), L'industria culturale in Italia (1998) and Le comunicazioni di massa (2000).

In the second stage of his academic life, Sorice developed studies on media and democracy: he has presented many papers on these topics at international conferences. In 2013, Sorice was the keynote speaker of the plenary session of the PSA Media and Politics Group at the 63rd Annual Conference of the Political Studies Association in Cardiff, Wales, March 25–27, presenting a paper about Web democracy between participation and populism: Crisis, Political parties and new movements in the Italian public sphere.

Sorice's recent books include I media (2005), La ricerca sull'audience (with E. De Blasio, G. Gili, M. Hibberd: 2007) Sociologia dei mass media (2009), "La comunicazione politica" (2011)., "La leadership politica. Media e costruzione del consenso" (2012), "Assessing Communication. Integrated Approaches in Political, Social and Business Context" (ed)., "I media e la democrazia", "Innovazione Democratica" and a methodological work ("Media, politica e società: le tecniche di ricerca") with E. De Blasio, M. Quaranta and M. Santaniello. In 2020, he has published "Sociologia dei media. Un'introduzione critica", an academic handbook placed in the area of critical media studies. His recent research focuses in particular on the relationship between political communication and populism, the political leadership, the participatory deliberative democracy, the social movements and, more generally, on the structural relationships between media and democracy analysed in a critical perspective. In this perspective, he has published articles (with E. De Blasio) in the International Journal of Communication and in tripleC.

Sorice was a professor of Media Studies at the University of Lugano (USI) in Switzerland and at Sapienza University of Rome in Italy. Since 2015 to 2018 he has been Honorary Professor at University of Stirling, Scotland, UK. He held lectures and seminars at many European universities. He has been leading the CMCS-LUISS working papers series for several years and he is member of the scientific board of Communication Management Quarterly, "Partecipazione & Conflitto" and "ComPol Comunicazione Politica"

Sorice served as Professor at the LUISS University in Rome, where he was the Director of the Centre for Media and Democratic Innovations "Massimo Baldini" until 2018. Since 2018 to 2023 he was the Director of the CCPS, Centre for Conflict and Participation Studies. He has been also an Invited Professor at Gregorian University. where he has been teaching Political Science.

Sorice was the coordinator, with Professor Philip Schlesinger, of an international research network focusing on media public services in Europe. Sorice was member of the SISP (Società Italiana di Scienza Politica), of the Media and Politics Specialist Group and of Participatory and Deliberative Democracy Specialist Group, both of the Political Studies Association (PSA) of UK. He is member of the Steering Committee of the SISCC (Società Italiana di Sociologia Cultura Comuncazione).

The most recent studies, in continuity with previous lines of research, move along two main axes: a) phenomena related to the relations between communicative ecosystems, digital capitalism and neoliberalism (also from the side of techno-feudalism); b) empirical research on vulnerable subjects in liminal spaces, also considering the empowerment potential represented by the adoption of digital tools. Since 2024, Sorice has returned to the Sapienza University of Rome, where he teaches Digital Media and Communication and Civic Engagement and coordinates the Research Unit on Media and Democracy at the Department of Communication and Social Research. He is also member of the Scientific Board of the Joint International Doctorate in Social Representations, Culture and Communication, based at Sapienza University of Rome.

== Select bibliography ==
Books

- Confini invisibili. Comunità liminali e pratiche di resistenza nella città neoliberista Milano: Meltemi, 2024 (with Maria Cristina Antonucci and Andrea Volterrani) ISBN 9788855199513
- Partecipazione democratica. Dialogando di sogni e realtà Roma: Castelvecchi, 2021. (with Giovanni Moro) ISBN 9788832905229
- Partecipazione disconnessa. Innovazione democratica e illusione digitale al tempo del neoliberismo Roma: Carocci, 2021. ISBN 9788829012121
- Sociologia dei media. Un'introduzione critica Roma: Carocci, 2020. ISBN 9788829000784
- Partecipazione democratica. Teorie e problemi Milano: Mondadori, 2019. ISBN 978-88-618-4706-4
- Media, politica, società. Le tecniche di ricerca (with E. De Blasio, M. Quaranta, M. Santaniello). Roma: Carocci, 2016. ISBN 978-88-430-8565-1
- Innovazione democratica. Un'introduzione (with E. De Blasio). Roma: LUISS University Press, 2016. ISBN 978-88-610-5243-7
- Mass media e sfera pubblica. Verso la fine della rappresentanza? (with L. Fasano, M. Panarari), Milano: Fondazione GiangiacomoFeltrinelli, 2016. ISBN 978-88-6835-257-8
- I media e la democrazia. Roma: Carocci, 2014. ISBN 978-88-430-7525-6
- Web democracy between participation and populism. Crisis, political parties and new movements in the Italian public sphere. Rome: CMCS-LUISS, 2013. ISBN 978-88-6536-023-1
- La leadership politica (with E. De Blasio, M. Hibberd, M. Higgins). Roma: Carocci, 2012. ISBN 978-88-430-6584-4.
- La comunicazione politica. Roma: Carocci, 2011. ISBN 978-88-430-5719-1.
- Popular politics, populism and the leaders. Access without participation?. The cases of Italy and UK (with E. De Blasio and M. Hibberd): Roma: CMCS-LUISS, 2011. ISBN 978-88-6536-021-7
- Yes credibility. La precaria credibilità del sistema dei media. Roma: Desk, 2010. ISBN 978-88-85343-77-1.
- Sociologia dei mass media. Roma: Carocci, 2009. ISBN 978-88-430-4893-9.
- Voci e membro del Consiglio Scientifico di Viganò, D. E. (a cura di) Dizionario della comunicazione. Roma: Carocci, 2009. ISBN 978-88-430-5180-9.
- La ricerca sull'audience (with E. De Blasio, G. Gili, M. Hibberd). Milano: Hoepli, 2007. ISBN 978-88-203-3774-2.
- I media. La prospettiva sociologica. Roma: Carocci, 2005. ISBN 978-88-430-3665-3.
- Voci e membro del Consiglio Scientifico di Colombo, F. (a cura di) Atlante della comunicazione. Milano: Hoepli, 2005
- Gli altri media. Ricerca nazionale sui media non mainstream (with F. Pasquali), Milano: Vita & Pensiero, 2005. ISBN 978-88-343-1250-6.
- La TV che non c'è (with G. Frezza). Salerno: Edizioni 10/17. 2004. ISBN 978-88-88862-08-8.
- Cantastorie mediali. La fiction come story teller della società italiana (with E. De Blasio). Roma: Dino Audino, 2004. ISBN 978-88-7524-146-9.
- Lo specchio magico. Linguaggi, formati, generi, pubblici della televisione italiana. Roma: Editori Riuniti, 2002. ISBN 978-88-359-5191-9.
- Le comunicazioni di massa: storia, teorie, tecniche. Roma: Editori Riuniti, 2000. ISBN 978-88-359-4938-1.
- Dizionario della comunicazione (with M. Morcellini). Roma: Editori Riuniti, 1999. ISBN 978-88-359-4564-2.
- Futuri immaginari. Le parole chiave dei new media. Roma: Logica University Press, 1998. ISBN 978-88-85095-12-0.
- L'industria culturale in Italia. Roma: Editori Riuniti, 1998. ISBN 978-88-359-4551-2.
- Logiche dell'illogico. Introduzione alle teorie del consumo. Roma: Seam, 1995. ISBN 978-88-86088-72-5.
- Le culture del consumo. Roma-Viterbo: Stampa Alternativa, 1995
- A trent'anni da Esperienze Pastorali di don Lorenzo Milani, Milano: Franco Angeli, 1990. ISBN 978-88-204-6400-4
- La Città Ideale. Italo Calvino dal pessimismo dell'intelligenza all'intelligenza dell'utopia. Roma: Merlo Editore, 1989

Edited

- Studiare i media. Prospettive disciplinari e parole chiave (with G. Balbi, F. Comunello, F. Pasquali). Roma: Carocci, 2025. ISBN 9788829029099.
- L’illusione della scelta. Come si manipola l’opinione pubblica in Italia (with Leonardo Morlino). Roma: Luiss University Press, 2021. ISBN 978-88-6105-591-9.
- Il servizio pubblico. Pluralismo, democrazia media (with E. De Blasio). Milano: Fondazione per la Sussidiarietà, 2014. ISBN 978-88-97793-08-3.
- Pluralismo Democrazia Media. Rapporto sui principali indicatori internazionali. (with E. De Blasio). Milano: Fondazione per la Sussidiarietà, 2013. ISBN 978-88-97793-06-9.
- Assessing Communication. Integrated Approaches in Political, Social and Business Contexts. Rome: LUISS University Press, 2012. ISBN 978-88-6105-132-4.
- Media e generazioni nella società italiana.(with F. Colombo, G. Boccia Artieri, L. Del Grosso Destreri, F. Pasquali). Milano: Franco Angeli, 2012. ISBN 978-88-568-4572-3.
- Leadership and New Trends in Political Communication (with E. De Blasio and M. Hibberd). Roma: CMCS-LUISS, 2011. ISBN 978-88-6536-008-8.
- Gillespie, M. (2007) Media Audiences. Milano: Hoepli (preface and editing), 2007. ISBN 978-88-203-3648-6.
- Programmi in scatola. Il format nella TV globale. Torino: Effatà, 2005. ISBN 978-88-7402-189-5.
- Lull, J. (2003) In famiglia, davanti alla televisione. Roma: Meltemi (preface and editing). 2003. ISBN 978-88-8353-231-3.

Chapters in books

- Cultural Studies, in Balbi, G., Comunello, F., Pasquali, F., Sorice, M.,Studiare i media. Prospettive disciplinari e parole chiave. Roma: Carocci, 2025 ISBN 9788829029099
- La crisi e il cammino che si apre. Prefazione a Cubeddu, F. Culture, Comunicazione, Resilienza. La società tra rischi, crisi ed emergenze. Napoli: Loffredo, 2024.
- La cittadinanza come movimento sociale. Note su Cittadinanza e classe sociale di Thomas Humphrey Marshall, in T.H. Marshall, Cittadinanza e classe sociale. Milano: Società Aperta, 2023.
- Critical media studies e sociologia di posizione, in: de Nardis, F., Petrillo, A., Simone, A. (a cura di). Sociologia di posizione. Milano: Meltemi, 2023.
- Piattaforme digitali fra neoliberismo e pratiche di resistenza, in Gola, E., Volteranni, A., Meloni, F., Careddu, A. (Eds.). Media, linguaggi, comunicazione: scenari del presente e del futuro. Cagliari: Università di Cagliari, 2023.
- Comunicazione politica e opinione pubblica, in: Gherardi, L. (a cura di). Brevi lezioni sull’opinione pubblica. Milano: Meltemi, 2022.
- La transizione tecnologico-digitale, in: Colombo, A., Magri, P. (a cura di). La grande transizione. Rapporto ISPI 2022. Milano: Ledizioni, 2022.
- Il compito di mettere in agenda l’Agenda, in: Piccini, M.P. e Springhetti, P. (a cura di). Pensare il futuro. I 17 obiettivi dell’Agenda 2030 visti dai giovani e raccontati dai giornalisti. Roma: LAS, 2021.
- Sorice, M. (2021). Prefazione, in Deflorian, S. (a cura di). Mobilitare processi trasformativi. Torino: Studio Kappa, 2021.
- Morlino, L. e Sorice, M. Quello che abbiamo appreso, in: Morlino, L. e Sorice, M. (a cura di) L’illusione della scelta. Come si manipola l’opinione pubblica in Italia. Roma: Luiss University Press, 2021.
- Manipolazione e influenza nei quotidiani. Premesse teoriche (con D. Vittori), in: Morlino, L. e Sorice, M. (a cura di) L’illusione della scelta. Come si manipola l’opinione pubblica in Italia. Roma: Luiss University Press, 2021.
- I media tradizionali tra persuasione e manipolazione (con D. Vittori e M. Zunino), in: Morlino, L. e Sorice, M. (a cura di) L’illusione della scelta. Come si manipola l’opinione pubblica in Italia. Roma: Luiss University Press, 2021.
- Propaganda e manipolazione: premesse teoriche (con D. Selva), in: Morlino, L. e Sorice, M. (a cura di) L’illusione della scelta. Come si manipola l’opinione pubblica in Italia. Roma: Luiss University Press, 2021.
- La narrazione del rischio nel tempo della crisi, in: Mangone, E. Incertezza, futuro, narrazione. Salerno: NaSC Free Press – Università degli Studi di Salerno, 2021.
- Opinione pubblica, in: Enciclopedia Italiana di Scienze, Lettere ed Arti. X Appendice. Roma: Istituto dell’Enciclopedia Italiana – Treccani, 2020.
- L’immagine del nemico nei social media (con E. De Blasio), in: Anselmi, M., Guercio, L. (a cura di) Il nemico. Milano: Mondadori Università, 2020.
- Conflitto e partecipazione, in: Mangone, E., Ieracitano, F., Russo, G. (Eds.) Processi culturali e mutamento sociale. Prospettive sociologiche. Roma: Carocci, 2020.
- Democratic Innovation. In: Harris P. et al. Eds. 2020. The Palgrave Encyclopedia of Interest Groups, Lobbying and Public Affairs. London: Palgrave Macmillan. doi:10.1007/978-3-030-13895-0. ISBN 978-3-030-13895-0
- Partido Plataforma: entre a Despolitizaçāo e Novas Formas de Participaçāo (with E. De Blasio). In: de Almeida Santos, J. (Ed.) 2020. Polìtica e Democracia na Era Digital. Lisboa: Parsifal.
- Technopopulism and Direct Representation. In Blokker, P. and Anselmi, M. 2020. Multiple Populisms. Italy as Democracy's Mirror. London: Routledge. ISBN 9780815361718
- The rising of populist parties in Italy. Techno-populism between neo-liberalism and direct democracy. In E. Hidalgo-Tenorio, M. Benítez-Castro and F. De Cesare (2019) Populist Discourse. Critical Approaches to Contemporary Politics. London: Routledge. ISBN 9781138541481
- Sociology of the Media. In Ryan, J. M. (Ed.) (2019) Core Concepts in Sociology. Hoboken, NJ: Wiley Blackwell.
- Open Government und Demokratie. Zwischen Effizienz und Partizipation (with E. De Blasio). In: Schünemann, Wolf J.; Kneuer, Marianne (eds.) (2018) E-Government und Netzpolitik im europäischen Vergleich, Nomos: Baden-Baden: 199-220.
- La complessa evoluzione della democrazia ibrida. Prefazione a Giacomini, G. (2018) Potere digitale. Come Internet sta cambiando la sfera pubblica e la democrazia. Milano: Meltemi.
- I populismi e la partecipazione politica. In Anselmi, M., Blokker, P. e Urbinati, N. (Eds.) (2018) Populismo di lotta e di governo. Milano: Fondazione Giangiancomo Feltrinelli: 136-153. ISBN 9788868353216
- Populismi e partecipazione. In Anselmi, M., Blokker, P. e Urbinati, N. (eds) (2018) La sfida populista. Milano: Fondazione Giangiacomo Feltrinelli: 105-119.
- Theresa and Jeremy: who is closer to Matteo? An Italian view of #GE2017 (with E. De Blasio). In: Thorsen, E., Jackson, D. and Lilleker, D. (2017) UK Election Analysis 2017: Media, Voters and the Campaign Early reflections from leading academics. Poole: University of Bournemouth.
- Democrazia, rappresentanza, innovazione democratica, in Mannari, E. (2016) Lezioni sulla democrazia, Milano: Bruno Mondadori, p. 11-24. ISBN 978-88-6774-150-2
- Comunicazione politica e democrazia, in Urbinati, N., a cura di (2016) Democrazie in transizione. Milano: Fondazione Giangiacomo Feltrinelli. ISBN 978-88-6835-244-8
- Politica e Rete, in Enciclopedia Italiana di Scienze, Lettere ed Arti. IX Appendice (2015) Roma: Istituto dell’Enciclopedia Italiana fondata da Giovanni Treccani.
- e-Participation and civic engagement. Active citizenship and Catholic associations in the framework of dialogic democracy, in Diez Bosch, M., Micò, J. L. and Carbonell, J. M. (2015) Catholic Communities Online. Barcelona: Blanquerna University. ISBN 978-84-9411-938-5
- Non solo propaganda. La comunicazione politica come strumento per la partecipazione democratica, in G. Vagnarelli, ed., Comunicazione politica: case studies. Ascoli: Piceno University Press – Capponi Editore.
- La famille italienne reste le rempart de l’individu. Entretien, in Heuzé, R. (2015) Italie. L’esthétique du miracle. Bruxelles: Editions Nevicata.
- Ideologia, in Laudonio, M., Panarari, M. (eds.) Alfabeto Grillo. Milano: Mimesis, 2014. ISBN 978-88-575-2015-5.
- Rischi e potenzialità della web democracy, in Aroldi, P. (ed.) La piazza, la rete e il voto. Democrazia, partecipazione e comunicazione politica ai tempi di internet. Roma: AVE, 2014. ISBN 978-88-8284-825-5.
- Sociology of Popular Culture and the Mass Media, in Runehov, A., Oviedo, L. (eds) Encyclopedia of Sciences and Religions. New York: Springer, 2013. ISBN 978-1-4020-8264-1.
- Gestire la relazione. Un leader gentile per una leadership orizzontale, in Gabardi, E. (ed.) La rivoluzione gentile. Milano: Franco Angeli, 2012. ISBN 978-88-204-0218-1.
- Persona e società riflessiva, in Ferone, E., Germano, I. (eds.) La persona nella teoria sociologica contemporanea. Torino: L'Harmattan. ISBN 978-88-7892-213-6.
- La logica del dialogo, in Cipollone, G. (ed.) La geopolitica della solidarietà. Roma: Gangemi, 2012
- Social media e Chiesa. Il tempo del dialogo, in Sanna, I. (ed.) L'etica della comunicazione nell'era digitale. Roma: Studium, 2012. ISBN 978-88-382-4162-8.
- I media fra effetti e partecipazione, in Bettetini, G. (2011) Non solo semiotica. Cinquant'anni di studi sulla comunicazione. Milano: Franco Angeli, 2011.
- Comunicare politica nel web 2.0, in Romanelli, E. (a cura di) Tre punto zero. Roma: Dino Audino Editore, 2011. ISBN 978-88-7527-188-6.
- Intermedialità e innovazione, in Girlanda, E. Il precinema oltre il cinema. Roma: Dino Audino Editore, 2010
- Fra tiepidi e impegnati (with E. De Blasio), in Romeo, A., Canestrari, P. (a cura di) Dall'uomo all'avatar e ritorno. Realtà e dimensioni emergenti. Verona: QuiEdit, 2010
- Prefazione in De Blasio, E., Peverini, P. Open Cinema. Scenari di visione cinematografica negli anni '10. Roma: Ente dello Spettacolo, 2010
- Apocalittici e integrati: i media digitali e la produzione culturale, in Padula, M. (a cura di) L'involucro della contemporaneità. Un discorso sui media. Roma: Lateran University Press., 2010
- Comunicazione e Politica, in Viganò, D. E. (a cura di) Dizionario della comunicazione. Roma: Carocci, 2009
- La ricerca sull'audience dei media. Strategie, metodi, nuove proposte, in Bay, M., Toso, M. (eds) Questioni di metodologia della ricerca nelle scienze umane. Roma: LAS, 2009
- Teorie e metodi della ricerca sull'audience, in De Blasio, E., Gili, G., Hibberd, M., Sorice, M. (2007) La ricerca sull'audience. Milano: Hoepli, 2007
- Il consumo performativo. Media e identità dei consumatori mediali, in Di Nallo, E., Paltrinieri, R. (2006) (a cura di) Cum Sumo. Prospettive di analisi del consumo nella società globale. Milano: Franco Angeli, 2006
- Gli studi sulla televisione, in Srampickal, J., Mazza, G., Baugh, L., Cross Connections. Roma: Pontificia Università Gregoriana, 2006
- I quotidiani sportivi in Italia. La narrazione dello sport come fiction sociale, in Catolfi, A., Nonni, G. (2006, a cura di) Comunicazione e Sport. Urbino: QuattroVenti, 2006
- Broadcasting, Consumo, Fruizione, Informazione, Media comunitari, Metropoli, Personaggio, Pirateria, Professioni mediali, Radio, Servizio pubblico, in Colombo F. (2005) Atlante della comunicazione. Milano: Hoepli, 2005
- Il format come prodotto culturale, in Sorice, M. (a cura di) (2005) Programmi in scatola. Il format nella TV globale. Torino: Effatà, 2005
- I formati della tv digitale, in Frezza L., Sorice M. (2004) La TV che non c'è. Salerno: 10/17, 2004
- Non ci si incontra mai per caso, in AA. VV. (2002) Per Alberto Abruzzese, Roma: Luca Sossella Editore, 2002
- La radio nell'industria culturale italiana, in Menduni, E. (2002, a cura di) La radio. Bologna: Baskerville, 2002
- Scenari della produzione dell'immaginario, in Morcellini, M. (2000, a cura di) Il MediaEvo. Roma: Carocci, 2000
- La cultura dei saperi: conoscere per crescere, in Eurispes (2000) I Rapporto Nazionale sulla Condizione dell'Infanzia e della Preadolescenza. Roma: Eurispes-Telefono azzurro, 2000
- La Conoscenza, in Eurispes (2000) Rapporto Italia 2000. Percorsi di ricerca nella società italiana. Roma: Eurispes, 2000
- Storia di Internet, in Piersanti, A., Roidi, V. (1999) (a cura di) Giornalisti nella rete. Roma: Ente dello Spettacolo, 1999
- Consumatori consumati, in Gily Reda, C. (1999) (a cura di) Frammenti di mondo. 30 sguardi sulla pubblicità. Napoli: Edizioni Scientifiche, 1999
- La grande bonaccia del mar delle Antille: il Pci e la cultura cattolica, in Morcellini, M., de Nardis, P. (1998) (a cura di) Viaggio in Italia. Roma: Meltemi, 1998
- La libertà multimediale, in de Nardis, P. (1998) Le nuove frontiere della sociologia. Roma: Carocci, 1998
- I media della socializzazione, in Sirchia, T. (1997) Le tre culture. Marsala: Editrice Scolastica Italiana, 1997
- Da Kruscev a Bill Gates. Passando per Paolo Rossi, in Abruzzese, A. (a cura di) (1996) La città della comunicazione. Roma: Seam, 1996
- Dall'evento al testo, in Faustini, G. (a cura di) Le tecniche del linguaggio giornalistico. Roma: La Nuova Italia Scientifica, 1995
- Una campagna elettorale al microscopio. Percorsi di analisi, in Morcellini, M. (1995) (a cura di) eLezioni di TV. Genova: Costa & Nolan, 1995
- Consumo, pubblicità, simboli: i nuovi linguaggi, in Atti del Convegno "La comunicazione cambia la società". Orvieto: Comune di Orvieto, 1995
- L'opinione pubblica nell'analisi sociologica e sociosemiotica, in Atti del Convegno "L'informazione nel 2000" (a cura di Zarzaca, B. e Battista, M). Roma: ANS, 1995
- I percorsi della semiotica, in Morcellini, M., Fatelli, G. (1994) Le scienze della comunicazione. Definizioni e percorsi disciplinari. Roma: La Nuova Italia Scientifica, 1994
- La linguistica, in Morcellini, M., Fatelli, G. (1994) Le scienze della comunicazione. Definizioni e percorsi disciplinari. Roma: La Nuova Italia Scientifica, 1994

Articles

- Liminalities: Social Vulnerabilities Between Participatory Processes and Digital Space in the Neoliberal Era (with M.C. Antonucci and A. Volterrani). SocietàMutamentoPolitica, 15(29/2024): 163-177. doi: 10.36253/smp15505.
- Populismi fra depoliticizzazione e ideologia (with M. Zunino). Rivista di Politica, 1 (2024): 9-15.
- The Public Role of Italian Sociology: Among Institutions, Universities and Social Engagement (with L. Viviani). The American Sociologist. https://doi.org/10.1007/s12108-024-09614-6
- La partecipazione politica al tempo del neoliberismo. CSI Review. 5:1(2024), pp. 9-19.
- Cristianesimo e media: una relazione bipolare? Indiscipline, vol. 3, n. 2, 2023: 79-83.
- Fra ideologia e immaginari: gli ecosistemi digitali ai tempi del neo-liberismo. Altopiano. Rivista di analisi politica, n. 2, 2023: 49-65.
- L’infosfera è davvero democratica? Aggiornamenti Sociali, ottobre 2023: 539-546.
- Lo stadio dei social. Confronti, settembre 2023: 11-14.
- Liminalità, partecipazione ed ecosistemi mediali negli spazi urbani (with A. Volterrani). H-Ermes 24(2023): 27-50. DOI 10.1285/i22840753n24p27
- De Blasio, E., Sorice, M. Il disordine informativo e l’odio in rete. Democrazia a rischio. H-Ermes. 23(2023): 217-244. DOI: 10.1285/i22840753n23p217
- La razionalità neoliberista e gli ecosistemi digitali: ideologia, narrazioni, immaginari. Quaderni di Teoria Sociale. 2/2022: 107-130. DOI: 10.57611/qts.v1i2.180
- La partecipazione democratica fra narrazione neoliberista e opportunità di inclusione. Studi Politici, 1/2022
- Social and digital vulnerabilities: The role of participatory processes in the reconfiguration of urban and digital space (with M.C. Antonucci and A. Volterrani). Frontiers in Political Science, vol. 4, 2022. DOI: 10.3389/fpos.2022.970958
- Il dibattito sul DDL Zan e la post-sfera pubblica italiana (with E. De Blasio and D. Selva). Mediascapes Journal, 19: 89-112.
- Partecipazione disconnessa. Democrazia deliberativa e azione sociale nel paradigma della crisi. Quaderni di Teoria Sociale. 1/2021: 115-142.
- La cornice e lo sguardo. Note sui percorsi di ricerca di Jay Blumler. Problemi dell’informazione. XLVI, 2/2021: 139-158.
- La “piattaformizzazione” della sfera pubblica. Comunicazione Politica. 3/2020: 371-388.
- La partecipazione politica nel tempo della post-democrazia. Culture e Studi del Sociale. 5(2)-2020: 397-406.
- The Ongoing Transformation of the Digital Public Sphere: Basic Considerations on a Moving Target (with E. De Blasio, M. Kneuer, W. Schüneman) Media and Communication. 8(4), 2020: 1-5.
- "Spaces of Struggle: Socialism and Neoliberalism With a Human Face Among Digital Parties and Online Movements in Europe" (with E. De Blasio).tripleC. tripleC. Communication, Capitalism and Critique. Journal for a Global Sustainable Information Society 18(1), pp. 84–100
- "E-Democracy and Digital Activism: From Divergent Paths Toward a New Frame" (with E. De Blasio). International Journal of Communication 13(2019), pp. 5715–5733
- "Populisms among technology, e-democracy and the depoliticisation process" (with E. De Blasio). "Revista Internacional de Sociología", 76(4):e109. doi:10.3989/ris.2018.76.4.18.00
- "Populism between direct democracy and the technological myth" (with. E. De Blasio). In Palgrave Communications, 4, 15.
- "La politica fra post-verità e social media". ItalianiEuropei, n. 3, 2017. ISSN 1593-5124.
- "Open Government: a Tool for Democracy?", in Media Studies, 8, 14, pp. 14–31 (ISSN 1847-9758; doi:10.20901/ms.7.14.3)
- "Democratic innovations and political communication. Liaisons dangereuses or new opportunity for democratizing democracy?", in Comunicazione politica, n. 3/2016, pp. 309–326, doi:10.3270/84676.
- "La partecipazione politica fra crisi dei partiti e democrazia partecipativa". In Sociologia e Politiche Sociali, vol. 17, n. 2, 2014. ISSN 1591-2027.
- (with E. De Blasio) "Radicals, rebels and maybe beyond. Social movements, women's leadership and the web 2.0 in the Italian political sphere". CMCS Working Papers. Roma: CMCS LUISS, 2014. ISBN 978-88-6536-018-7 doi:10.978.886536/0187.
- "Web e politica: un gioco in difesa", in ItalianiEuropei, n. 2, 2014. ISSN 1593-5124
- "The framing of climate change in Italian politics and its impact on public opinion", in International Journal of Media and Cultural Politics, vol. 9, n. 1, 2013 doi:10.1386/macp.9.1.59_1
- "Rischi e potenzialità della web democracy", in Dialoghi, a. XIII, n. 3, 2013. ISSN 1593-5760.
- (with P. Schlesinger) "The Transformation of Society and Public Service Broadcasting", CMCS Working Papers, 1, 2011
- (with E. De Blasio) "Italian Politics in the Web 2.0. Participation, Mistrust and Disintermediation Processes".CMCS Working Papers, 2, 2010
- "Involvement and/or Participation. Mobility and Social Networking between identity self-construction and political impact", Media, Communication and Humanity, Medi@lse Fifth Anniversary Conference, London School of Economics, 2008
- "Beyond the Borders", in Communication Director, n. 1/2008. Bruxelles, 2008
- "Alla ricerca dell'audience perduta", in Economia della cultura, a. XVII, n. 3, 2007
- "Il Grande Fratello alla prova del format", in Dialoghi, a. VII, n. 1, 2007
- "Mobile Audiences. Methodological Problems and New Perspectives in Audience Studies", Transforming Audiences Proceedings, University of Westminster; ora in Sorice, M. (2009) Mobile Audiences. Methodological Problems and New Perspectives in Audience Studies. Roma: CMCS Working Papers, 2007
- "Cultural Studies in Italy and the Influence of Gramsci, Catholic Culture and the Birmingham School (CCCS)", Cultural Studies Now Proceedings, University of East London; ora in De Blasio, E., Sorice, M. (2009) Cultural Studies in Italy and the Influence of Gramsci, Catholic Culture and the Birmingham School (CCCS). Roma: CMCS Working Papers, 2007
- "Media Research: Scanning the Horizon, Breaking the Frames", in Studies in Communication Sciences. vol. 1 ISSN 1424-4896, 2006
- "Control Social y Manipulaciòn de la Comunicaciòn", in Nuntium. Madrid: Instituto de Humanidades Angel Ayala, 2006
- "La comunicazione dal basso", in Storia e Società. a. VIII, n. 27, giugno 2006, 2005
- "Esiste ancora l'audience?", in Radiotelevisione. Opinione pubblica e Auditel. Roma: Istituto Italiano di Studi Legislativi, 2005
- "Observing fiction from italian angle" in Studies in Communication Sciences. vol. 1 ISSN 1424-4896, 2004
- "Sempre sintonizzata sulla storia d'Italia", in Letture, a. 59, n. 610. Alba: San Paolo, 2004
- "Cinquant'anni di Mamma Rai", in Letture, a. 59, n. 603. Alba: San Paolo, 2004
- "Glocal Medium", in Quaderni di Comunicazione dell'Università degli Studi di Lecce, a. II, n. 2, 2003
- "La radio nell'industria culturale italiana", in Comunicando, a. II, n. 4. Cosenza: Editoriale Bios, 2001
- "Radio Days in the Seventies" in Comunicazioni Sociali, n. 1, a. XXIII. Milano: Università Cattolica del Sacro Cuore, Vita & Pensiero, 2001
- "On-line journalism: information and culture in the Italian technological imaginary", in Modern Italy, n.1. London: Carfax Publishing, 2001
- "Le strategie e le tecnologie della comunicazione interna", in Ioly, M., Vitale, F. (2000) Lo Stato elettronico. New media e pubblica amministrazione. Quaderni. Rivista trimestrale del Ministero delle Finanze. 2000
- "Comunicare la formazione", in URP, n. 9. Roma: Presidenza del Consiglio, 1998
- "Le comunicazioni sociali e il loro ruolo nel progetto della Chiesa", in Notiziario C.I.I., n. 19, 1998
- "La comunicazione come risorsa strategica per i diritti di cittadinanza", in Sistema previdenza, nn. 174–175. Roma: INPS, 1997
- "Quale mercato, quale formazione? Sbocchi professionali e attese delle imprese", in Atti del convegno "Comunicare l'impresa: una professione europea". Torino: ComItalia, 1997
- "Proposte per una rilettura sociologica del concetto di rischio, dell'identità del minore e dei processi di socializzazione" in Minori a rischio e istituzioni, Milano: Giuffrè, 1996
