= Masuda (surname) =

Masuda (written: 増田, 益田, 舛田, 桝田 or 升田) is a Japanese surname. Notable people with the surname include:

- Akemi Masuda (増田明美, born 1964), Japanese long-distance runner
- Akira Masuda (増田章) (born 1962), Japanese karateka
- Chikashi Masuda (増田誓志, born 1985), Japanese football player
- Erina Masuda (枡田 絵理奈, born 1985), Japanese announcer
- Fusako Masuda (増田房子, born 1968), Japanese race walker
- Hiroya Masuda (増田寛也, born 1951), Japanese politician
- Isamu Masuda (増田勇, 1872–1945), Japanese physician
- Junichi Masuda (増田順一, born 1968), Japanese video game composer
- Keiko Masuda (増田恵子, born 1957), Japanese pop singer and actress
- Keita Masuda (舛田圭太, born 1979), Japanese badminton player
- Koji Masuda (益田 弘二, born 1944), Japanese boxer
- Kosaku Masuda (増田功作, born 1976), Japanese football player
- Kosuke Masuda, Japanese artist
- Kōsuke Masuda (増田こうすけ, born 1976), manga artist
- Kōzō Masuda, Japanese shogi player
- Mitsuhiko Masuda (増田光彦, born 1937), Japanese professional golfer
- Naoya Masuda (益田直也, born 1989), Japanese professional baseball player
- Nariyuki Masuda (増田成幸, born 1983), Japanese racing cyclist
- Nobuhiro Masuda (増田伸洋, born 1973), Japanese professional golfer
- Ryuji Masuda (増田龍治), Japanese animation director
- Shigeto Masuda (増田繁人, born 1992), Japanese football player
- Tadatoshi Masuda (増田忠俊, born 1973), Japanese football player
- Takahiko Masuda (増田貴彦), cultural psychologist
- Takahisa Masuda (増田貴久, born 1986), Japanese idol
- Masuda Takashi (益田 孝, 1848–1938), Japanese industrialist, investor, and art collector
- Takashi Masuda (computer scientist) (益田 隆司, born 1939), Japanese computer scientist
- Takashi Masuda (basketball) (増田 貴史, born 1940), Japanese basketball player
- Takuya Masuda (増田卓也, born 1989), Japanese football player
- Toshiki Masuda (増田 俊樹, born 1990), Japanese voice actor
- Toshio Masuda (舛田利雄, born 1927), Japanese film director
- Yasuhiro Masuda, Japanese shogi player
- Yoneji Masuda (増田米治, 1905–1995), Japanese sociologist
- Yoshio Masuda (died 2009), Japanese naval commander
- Yūji Masuda (増田 裕司, born 1971), Japanese shogi player
- Yuki Masuda (増田ゆき, born 1973), Japanese voice actress
- Yūki Masuda (増田裕生, born 1979), Japanese voice actor
- Yuri Masuda (益田祐里, born 1977), Japanese singer
