= Political economy of communications =

Branch of communication studies and media studies

The political economy of communications (PEC) is a branch of communication studies or media studies which studies the power relations that shape the communication of information from the mass media to its public. PEC analyzes the power relations between the mass media system, information and communications technologies (ICTs) and the wider socioeconomic structure in which these operate, with a focus on understanding the historical and current state of technological developments. PEC has proliferated in the 2000s with the modernization of technology. The advancement of media has created conversation about the effects of colonialism and PEC.

== Influences ==
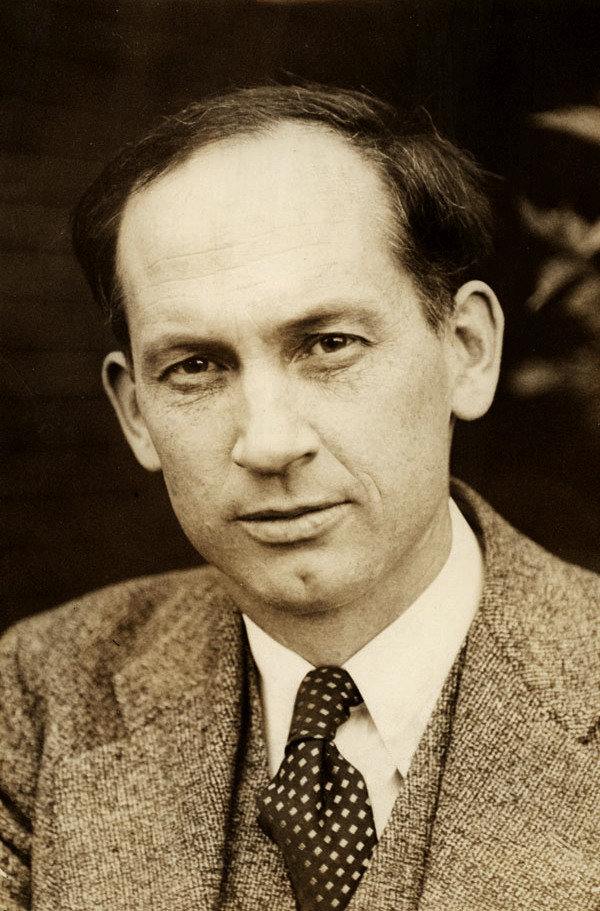
Harold Innis, a foundational teacher of political economy.

One of the earliest modern works in political economy of communications scholarship is from Harold Innis, these theories were compiled in the book Empire and Communications. Innis directly inspired Marshall McLuhan, a colleague of his at the University of Toronto, who would later be made famous for the dictum "the medium is the message". Subsequent PEC approaches have been heavily influenced by Marxist thought and democratic politics, as it questions the powers residing within communications and the state necessary for democracy to be realized. Below the theories and their approaches are explained:

- Marxist thought - The moral philosophy (or ethics) of PEC often criticizes capitalism for its effect on media and democracy, this idea originates from the critical theory works of Karl Marx. A common critique of critical political economy (often from the cultural studies approach) is that, like Marx, it fetishizes capitalism and is deterministic technologically and/or economically. Christian Fuchs and Vincent Mosco in their book Marx and the Political Economy of the Media compile the effects of media communication in a capitalist society. They note that the media is a circulator and contributor of ideologies, even more so with the prevalence of alternative news sources.
- Democratic Politics - PEC views media and information as the ultimate democratizer of power, and thus includes social praxis as a criterion. Ultimately, this means that PEC encourages media reform and government intervention in the marketplace.

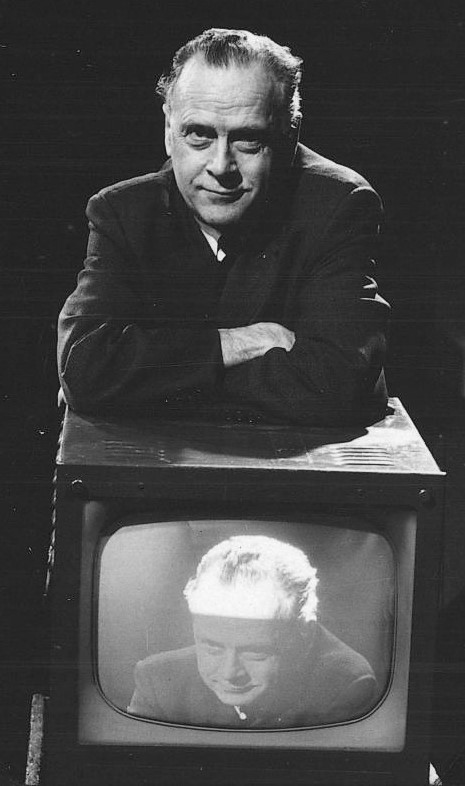
Marshall McLuhan, a seminal theorist in media studies. Often known for the quotation, "the medium is the message."

Along with Innis and McLuhan, the political economy of communications was significantly impacted by economist Robert A. Brady's teachings. Brady initiated a search of social practices and emerging authoritarianism that were later explored by Dallas W. Smythe and Herbert I. Schiller. Brady did not officially work with the structure of Marxist philosophy; he was rather focused on "the interaction of social and economic factors in a business. Lastly, after pursuing research Brady concluded that the principal issue was whether planning and decision making within a company could adapt to decision making by majority of votes. In 1988 Edward S. Herman and Noam Chomsky produced the propaganda model to reflect how the political economy of mass communications operated in a more empirical capacity.

== Central characteristics ==
There are four central characteristics that are integral to expanding the definition of PEC. They provide the means to analyze an issue, technology or way of life through a political economic perspective. The characteristics are as follows:

- History and Social Change: It is necessary to analyze the history of a subject and compare it to the present day in order to find out who or what is responsible for social change. Through this, one is able to attain a deeper understanding and identify patterns that will provide guidance and clarity for future transformations and social change.
- Social Totality: This characteristic discusses the "big picture". It is necessary to look at circumstances through various point of views and determines the approach to other aspects such as economic, social and cultural to see what elements that society is lacking of and then find a solution to tackle the issue.
- Moral Philosophy or Ethics: Moral Philosophy or more commonly known as Ethics when used in PEC, serves to articulate morals that reside within economic and politically economic perspectives. When employing the characteristic in analysis, it is necessary to assess the moral implications of a situation, and how it impacts society as a whole.
- Praxis: A combination of "practice" and "theory". Praxis discusses the importance of action and intervention. Those who are examining a situation through a PEC lens should combine the knowledge attained from the three previous characteristics to paint a vivid picture that is flexible to reality and act where change is necessary and suitable for society, and human civilization.

== Main topics ==
The political economy of communication looks at a range of issues that affect society. Below are the main topics of study that political economists often discuss.

- Capitalism: There are two main tenets that define a capitalist economy; Wage Labour and Production for Profit. Political economists are interested in capitalism as it is shapes production and distribution, and reveals power relations embedded in society. However, in some ways, as the capitalism raises problems like commodification and commercialization, PEC criticizes capitalism for these reasons.
- Media ownership: Concentration of ownership in media industries as a result of convergence and media conglomeration under neoliberal economics have become a concern for media diversity and democratic discourse.
- Support Mechanisms: Advertising, marketing, subscription, social media, and crowdfunding revenues are examples of economic support for media organizations. These mechanisms influence which content is or is not published, and the nature of the commodity (content vs. the audience vs. advertisers), thus making these mechanisms relevant to PEC studies. This idea has proliferated with the rise of social media and the "work from home" job.
- Government Policy: Policy regulates media ownership, affecting how media industries operate and the role they play in society. Policy that determines media ownership also determines how policy is talked about. In relation to support mechanisms, media outlets like Substack influence their own story bias based on their paid readership.
- Globalization: Globalization within PEC is about increasing the communication and interaction between countries to aim for development. Especially in communication theory supports the idea that globalization helps trade flow and economic growth. For instance, the Korean idol group SuperM had their debut in the US in 2019, the group's popularity began to spread and attract many supporters. Therefore, SuperM's fans start to buy their album, goods and results in the trading flow runs smoothly.
- Regulation: Policies or laws which are offered by the government to control every activity, especially in the market and trading flow. The most important thing is the activities of private industries and citizens will be interfered by government regulation. The arguments through PEC are a balancing act, on one hand regulation helps to maintain the social order as without it, people who have more power will be the one control the society. On the other hand overwhelmed involvement of the state might cause difficulties for private companies to run smoothly.
- Neoliberalism: Neoliberalism is characterized by deregulating, encouraging privatization and decreasing trade barriers. Special focus is placed on the meaning of "freedom" and "agency".

Logo of News Corp, a mass media conglomerate and a subject of concentrated ownership.

== Journalism and media ==
Because journalism/news media is the core to a functioning democratic society, PEC works towards the goal of "healthy journalism".

Healthy journalism can be defined through four characteristics, outlined by Robert W. McChesney. The first characteristic is ensuring that journalists are thorough and exhaustive in reports of the elite. The second is ensuring that the news being produced keeps the needs of the larger public in mind, as their power resides in knowledge and not property. Thirdly, it must remain truthful, and has systems in place to guarantee the truth. Lastly, a range of opinions on a wide array of topics is required as to provide insight and depth on what is happening, what is to happen and what to do about it. Unfortunately for democracy, the current state of news media around the world and especially that of the United States, falls short of the general consensus among media scholars and democratic theory on what is considered to be healthy journalism. This is due in part to the overwhelming amount of public relations material being posed as news.

It is in the interest of PEC that journalism instead provide a "rigorous account" of those in power, meet the information needs of all classes and people, be truthful, and act as an early warning system that provides a "wide range of informed opinions on the most important issues of our time."

Propaganda model: affecting thoughts, using mass media to influence audiences with the desire to change their behaviors to be more in line with elite capitalist interests. The propaganda model can be made by anyone, who wants to advocate their thoughts. Different from the concept of ideology which operates unconsciously, propaganda is operated intentionally. The propaganda model relates to news media, which includes 5 filters which suggests how the news is "filtered" and edited into a content that suits the demand and interests of those people who have more power and wealth, especially corporations and the government.

- Size, ownership of the medium
- Medium's funding sources
- Sourcing
- Flak
- Anti-communism ideology

=== New Media ===
The mass media are undoubtedly experiencing considerable changes in platform, technology, and economic structure (e.g., crowdfunding, social media) as the digital era continues to shift people toward new media. Traditional financial configurations and business models have been destabilized by this transformation. However, new mechanisms of power have emerged from this more open system of information and news creation. The availability of information can now be skewed or influenced through "search, aggregation, and digital distribution infrastructures." Vincent Mosco's definition of political economic studies, where the "production, distribution, and consumption of resources, including communication resources" are essential, remains relevant in times of new media since a new network economy or society forms its own power relations. Further, modern critical theorists like Christian Fuchs have critiqued new media from a capitalist-critical perspective, creating new critical PEC theories to attempt to explain some of the failings of new media.
