= Masuda (disambiguation) =

Masuda is a city in Shimane Prefecture, Japan.

Masuda may also refer to:

== Places ==
- Masuda, Akita, a town in Akita Prefecture, Japan
- Masuda Station, a railway station in Masuda, Shimane Prefecture

== Other uses ==
- Masuda (surname), a Japanese surname
- Masuda Sultan (born 1978), an Afghan American human rights advocate
- 13654 Masuda, a main-belt minor planet

== See also ==
- Matsuda
