= A Turn to Empire: The Rise of Imperial Liberalism in Britain and France =

2005 book by Jennifer Pitts

- Cover
- Author: Jennifer Pitts
- Language: English
- Subject: Imperial liberalism, British and French political thought, Imperialism, Adam Smith, Edmund Burke, Jeremy Bentham, and John Stuart Mill and Alexis de Tocqueville
- Genre: Non-fiction
- Publisher: Princeton University Press
- Publication date: 2005
- Publication place: United States
- Media type: Print

A Turn to Empire: The Rise of Imperial Liberalism in Britain and France is a 2005 book by American political scientist Jennifer Pitts. Pitts investigates how British and French liberal thinkers shifted from criticizing empire in the late eighteenth century to supporting imperialism by the mid-nineteenth century. She studies the writings of Adam Smith, Edmund Burke, Jeremy Bentham, James Mill, John Stuart Mill, and Alexis de Tocqueville, among others, to demonstrate how liberal principles of equality and self-government were reinterpreted to justify imperial rule over non-European peoples. The book traces this intellectual transformation through three periods: early critics of empire, the utilitarian turn in Britain, and the liberal shift in France, especially towards Algeria.

== Summary ==
Pitts investigates how British and French liberal thinkers shifted from skepticism and criticism of empire in the late eighteenth century to explicit justification and support of imperialism by the mid-nineteenth century. She traces how prominent intellectual figures reconciled liberal values—including equality, liberty, and representative government—with imperialist expansion, arguing that these liberal principles underwent significant reinterpretation to legitimize empire-building activities.

The book is organized into three main sections, each studying influential thinkers and their evolving perspectives on empire. The first section, "Critics of Empire," explores early voices of opposition to imperialist ideology, especially Adam Smith and Edmund Burke. Smith's analysis emphasized the complexity of societal development while critiquing colonial exploitation. Burke presented a moral and universalist critique of British rule in India and Ireland, drawing attention to systemic oppression and moral exclusion.

The second section, "Utilitarians and the Turn to Empire in Britain," portrays the transformation within British liberalism through utilitarian philosophy. Jeremy Bentham, initially critical of colonial rule due to its inherent injustices, stands in contrast to James Mill and John Stuart Mill, whose writings progressively justified British domination over societies they considered backward, particularly India and Ireland. John Stuart Mill articulated a doctrine of "progressive despotism," arguing that authoritarian rule could be legitimate when aimed at civilizing societies deemed incapable of self-government.

The third section, "Liberals and the Turn to Empire in France," analyzes French liberalism's changing stance toward empire, analyzing figures including Condorcet, Benjamin Constant, and Alexis de Tocqueville. Tocqueville's writings receive more attention, especially his influential work on French colonial policy in Algeria, where he advocated shifting from cultural assimilation to outright domination. Pitts demonstrates how Tocqueville viewed imperial conquest as essential for strengthening liberal democracy domestically and securing France's international standing.

Pitts contrasts, in her conclusion, the eighteenth-century critiques of empire with the anxieties and contradictions that emerged within nineteenth-century liberalism as it rationalized imperial expansion. She notes that despite widespread acceptance of imperialism by mid-century, some liberals continued to harbor doubts about the justice of imperial projects.

== Critical reception ==
Stanley Hoffmann described the book as a "splendid contribution," illuminating one of liberalism's fundamental contradictions. Hoffmann recommended the book as exemplary for both intellectual historians and political scientists. He stressed Pitts's portrayal of British and French liberal thinkers, notably Adam Smith, Edmund Burke, Jeremy Bentham, and later John Stuart Mill and Alexis de Tocqueville. These figures, initially skeptical or even critical of colonial ventures, subsequently adopted imperial justifications rooted in cultural superiority and civilizing missions.

Anthony Howe echoed this appreciation, noting that Pitts's analysis was "cogent," "acute," and "lucid." Howe was impressed by her careful reconstruction of the philosophical transformations that took place, emphasizing subtle but critical changes in liberal thought from Smith and Burke's skepticism toward empire to James and John Stuart Mill's confident advocacy for British colonial rule. However, Howe pointed out ambiguities in Pitts's conclusions, suggesting that while her account of intellectual shifts was compelling, the degree and nature of imperial liberalism identified in Mill and Tocqueville remain somewhat debatable.

In his review for Revue d'études benthamiennes, Armand Guillot analyzed how the book traced a decisive turning point in liberal thought, where major liberal theorists who opposed imperialism in the 1780s became its strongest advocates by the 1830s. Guillot stressed Pitts's refusal to accept either that liberalism inherently forbids imperial policies or that imperialism was an inevitable development of liberal doctrine, instead showing how different historical contexts shaped liberal thinking. Guillot observed how Pitts demonstrated that Adam Smith interpreted societal evolution as progress without establishing hierarchy between societies, maintaining that all societies were equally worthy of respect as rational responses to different circumstances. He underscored her analysis of Burke's use of sympathy and moral imagination to combat British imperial injustices, and her discussion of Bentham's critique based on colonizers' inability to know the colonized peoples' real interests. Guillot particularly focused on Pitts's treatment of the break represented by James Mill and John Stuart Mill, who justified despotic imperial government by associating utility with a fixed distinction between civilized and barbaric societies. Guillot thought that Pitts successfully demonstrated that liberalism neither excludes imperialism in principle nor necessarily implies it, showing that liberal thought cannot be adequately understood outside of its theorists' concrete political engagements.

In his review, German historian Benedikt Stuchtey explored the book's central question about the significant tension in liberal thought regarding colonial expansion from the 18th to mid-19th century. He noted how Pitts demonstrated that before 1800, liberal thinkers like Adam Smith, Jeremy Bentham, and Edmund Burke criticized colonialism on political, economic, and moral grounds, yet only decades later, James and John Stuart Mill along with Tocqueville emerged as defenders of the imperial project. Stuchtey found this transformation particularly remarkable because later generations had built upon their predecessors' fundamental political and social views while dramatically breaking with their assessment of colonial policy. He appreciated Pitts's analysis of how the concept of a "civilizing mission" served to justify colonial expansion, noting how tolerance for cultural differences received little argumentative space as the West's supposed civilizational superiority became the primary justification for colonial violence. Stuchtey observed that colonial expansion paradoxically represented a stabilizing factor for Western European democracies in liberals' eyes. Finally, he noted Pitts's insight that the intellectual circle closed when late Tocqueville returned to colonial-critical views, warning about the arrogance of colonial rule and its unpredictable social and political conflicts, and suggesting that liberal thought was never entirely blind to the dangers of illiberal political action even as European imperial expansion became unstoppable during the 19th century.

Georgios Varouxakis recognized Pitts's influence on subsequent scholarship, and said her work inspired much of the later discourse on liberalism and imperialism. Yet, Varouxakis thought that Pitts did not portray imperialism as an inherent or inevitable consequence of liberal philosophy—a significant departure from earlier interpretations. Instead, Pitts argued that liberals like Mill and Tocqueville adopted imperial ideologies due to specific historical contexts rather than intrinsic liberal principles.

American political scientist Fonna Forman commended her scholarship for its rigorous documentation and clarity. Forman pointed to the depiction of later liberal support for empire as an unfortunate "volte-face," implicitly creating a stark contrast between liberal heroes and villains.

Alex Tyrrell, from La Trobe University, cherished Pitts for clearly articulating the "turn to empire" among British and French liberals, and considered her analysis as significant and convincing, though also implicitly noting a somewhat simplified characterization of liberal shifts.

Charles J. Faruki endorsed Pitts's insights into why liberals supported imperial ventures, including their perception of empire as essential for fostering national pride and avoiding domestic instability. Yet, Faruki also suggested her explanations occasionally relied on broad generalizations regarding narratives of cultural superiority that justified imperial rule.

British sociologist Krishan Kumar described the work as a "timely and illuminating study".

While John Cramsie recognized Pitts's thoughtful restoration of complexity and ambiguity to the liberal thinkers she discussed. Cramsie also noticed the absence of detailed attention to interactions between metropolitan ideas and colonial responses, suggesting this as a fruitful area for further investigation.

Anthony Pagden considered the book a "brilliantly successful attempt" to explain the shift from fierce anti-imperial sentiment in the late 18th century to pro-imperial advocacy in the 19th century. Pagden found Pitts's finest analysis in her discussion of Tocqueville and the Algerian question, where she revealed how Tocqueville's indifference to North African peoples stemmed from his prioritization of France's political future. Pagden said the book made understanding European imperialism "a great deal easier" and remained of "immense and pressing importance" for comprehending contemporary issues of democracy and globalization.

K. Steven Vincent described it as "elegant and provocative," and emphasized her persuasive reassessment of the central role imperialist thought played in the philosophies of Mill and Tocqueville. Vincent commended Pitts for clearly establishing empire as central, rather than peripheral, to liberal thought by the mid-19th century.

Michael Bentley said that Pitts provided more clarity about the shift itself rather than thoroughly explaining the reasons behind liberalism's ideological transition, suggesting the book required broader cultural-historical context for deeper explanation. Still, Bentley praised the analytical rigor and contributions to debates about liberalism and imperialism in the book.

Peter Cain considered Pitts's work "impressive and original," highlighting her nuanced depiction of the loss of moral imagination among European liberals regarding non-Europeans. Cain appreciated Pitts's comparative approach to British and French thought but suggested that the concept of "character," important to Mill, might have warranted further exploration. He also indicated that incorporating perspectives beyond elite circles could have enriched the analysis.

Theodore Koditschek considered the work "impressive" and "pathbreaking," and welcomed her sophisticated readings of familiar liberal theorists. Koditschek, however, noted Pitts's occasional overstatement in portraying liberal shifts, and suggested that the reality was more gradual and nuanced. He noticed inherent contradictions within liberalism itself, and pointed out that broader social and historical frameworks were necessary to fully comprehend the ideological shift described by Pitts.
