= Aomori Junior College =

Coordinates: 40°47′09″N 140°46′42″E

- 青森短期大学
- Type: Private
- Active: 1962–2013
- Location: Aomori, Aomori, Japan
- Website: http://www.aomori-u.ac.jp/

Aomori Junior College (青森短期大学, Aomori Tanki Daigaku) was a private junior college located in Aomori, Aomori Prefecture Japan. It was established in 1962, and was attached to Aomori University.

== Department and Graduate Course ==
=== Departments ===
- Course of information
- Course of library
- Course of sports
- Course of child

=== Available certifications ===
- You can obtain Professional certification of Child care person in Course of child.
- You can acquire license of junior high school teacher in second class in Course of information
- You can obtain Professional certification of librarian

== See also ==
- List of junior colleges in Japan
