= Krishan Kumar (sociologist) =

British sociologist (born 1942)

- Born: 1942 (age 83–84); Trinidad and Tobago
- Education: St John's College, Cambridge, London School of Economics, University of Kent
- Scientific career
- Fields: Sociology, history
- Workplaces: BBC, University of Kent, University of Virginia

Krishan Kumar (born 1942 in Trinidad and Tobago) is a British sociologist who is currently William R. Kenan, Jr., Professor of Sociology at the University of Virginia.

== Early life and education ==
Kumar was educated at William Ellis School in London and studied as an undergraduate at St John's College, Cambridge and for a master's degree at the London School of Economics. He then worked as a lecturer at the University of Kent from 1967, where he also studied for a PhD, and had a spell as a producer for the talks and documentaries department of the BBC.

== Career ==
Kumar remained at Kent, attaining the position of Professor of Social and Political Thought, until his appointment at Virginia in 1996.

Kumar has held several visiting professorships, including at the University of Bristol, the Central European University and the École des Hautes Études en Sciences Sociales, and has been a visiting scholar at Harvard University and a member of the Institute for Advanced Study, Princeton. His research interests include nationalism and European and human history.

Kumar's publications include Prophecy and Progress: The Sociology of Industrial and Post-Industrial Society (Allen Lane, 1978), Utopia and Anti-Utopia in Modern Times (Basil Blackwell, 1987), The Rise of Modern Society: Aspects of the Social and Political Development of the West (Basil Blackwell, 1988), Utopianism (Open University Press, 1991), 1989: Revolutionary Ideas and Ideals (University of Minnesota Press, 2001) and The Making of English National Identity (Cambridge University Press, 2003). The latter was described by Bernard Crick as a "scholarly masterpiece" and "the deepest and best reflection so far by a fine sociologist and an intellectual historian". His work on utopianism, meanwhile, "should...find an admired place in contemporary sociology", according to Frank Webster. Kumar has also published articles in academic journals, including Sociology, the European Journal of Political Research, the European Journal of Sociology, Theory and Society, Political Studies, the British Journal of Sociology, the European Journal of Social Theory and Nations and Nationalism.
