= Christian Fuchs (sociologist) =

Austrian social scientist (born 1976)

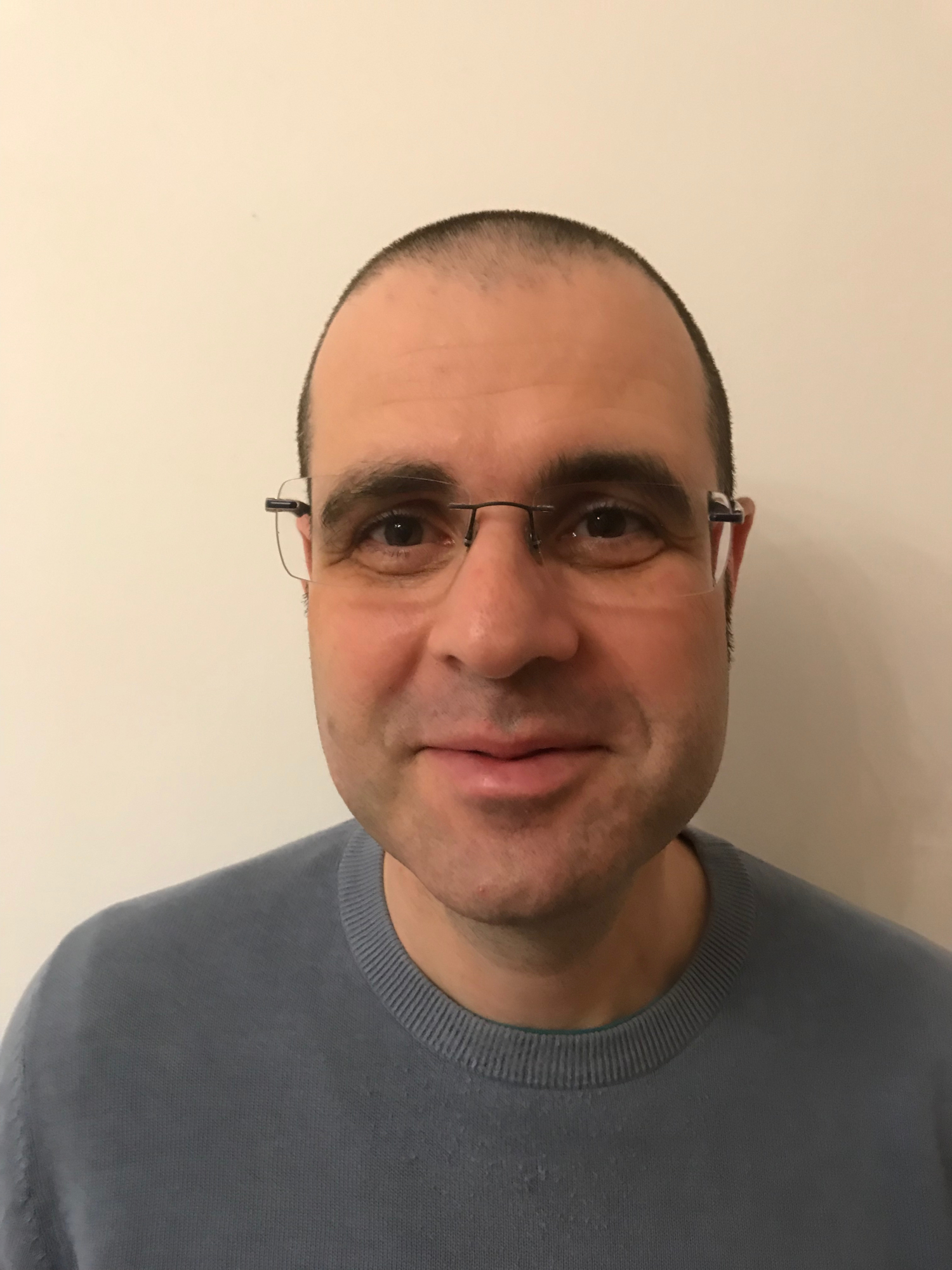
- Born: 1976 (age 49–50); Waidhofen an der Thaya
- Occupation: Researcher
- Known for: Critical digital theory Critical social media theory Political economy of communications Information society theory

Academic background
- Education: Vienna University of Technology (MSc) Vienna University of Technology (PhD)
- Alma mater: Vienna University of Technology

Academic work
- Discipline: Communication Studies
- Sub-discipline: Critical Communication Studies
- Institutions: Paderborn University

Christian Fuchs is an Austrian social scientist. From 2013 until 2022 he was Professor of Social Media and Professor of Media, Communication & Society at the University of Westminster, where he also was the Director of the Communication and Media Research Institute (CAMRI). Since 2022, he has been Professor of Media Systems and Media Organisation at Paderborn University. He is an editor for the open access journal tripleC: Communications, Capitalism & Critique. Fuchs is also the co-founder of the ICTs and Society-network, a researcher network that studies societal and digital media interactions. He is the editor of the book series 'Critical, Digital and Social Media Studies', which he helped establish in 2015.

Fuchs has been an influential voice within the area of social media and internet critique, his work is influenced by the critical theory school of thought. Fuchs' expertise includes social theory, critical theory, critical digital and social media research, Internet & society, the political economy of media and communications, and information society theory.

== Early life and education ==
Fuchs was born in 1976 in the village of Waidhofen an der Thaya in Austria, where he lived until 18, whereby he then moved to Vienna. This rural region of Northern Austria was at the time deindustrialized and the area he lived in was socially disadvantaged.

In 1994 he studied informatics at the Vienna University of Technology until 2000, obtaining an MSc in informatics. He then became interested in the social and politico-economic impacts of communication technologies and chose to specialize in social informatics, then gaining his technical science PhD from the school's Institute for Design and Assessment of Technology. From 2000 to 2006 he lectured in sociology and philosophy of information technology at the department.

== Academic career ==
From 2015 until 2017, Fuchs was a member of the European Sociological Association's executive board, where he helped organize the 2017 ESA conference in Athens.

In his 2014 book Social Media: A Critical Introduction, Fuchs expressed criticism towards media scholar Henry Jenkins and his 2007 book Convergence Culture, in which Jenkins explores participation in culture, for having excluded factors such as power and equality in his analysis and stated that Jenkins is a "cultural reductionist".

== Books (Monographs) ==
- Internet and Society. Social Theory in the Information Age (Routledge, 2008) ISBN 978-0203937778
- Practical Civil Virtues in Cyberspace: Towards the Utopian Identity of Civitas and Multitudo (Shaker, 2009) ISBN 978-3832283414 (co-author Rainer E. Zimmermann)
- Foundations of Critical Media and Information Studies (Routledge, 2011) ISBN 978-0415588812
- Digital Labour and Karl Marx (Routledge 2014) ISBN 0745339999
- Social Media: A Critical Introduction (Sage 2014, first edition) ISBN 978-1473966833
- OccupyMedia! The Occupy Movement and Social Media in Crisis Capitalism (Zero Books, 2014) ISBN 978-1782794059
- Culture and Economy in the Age of Social Media (Routledge, 2015) ISBN 978-1138839311
- Reading Marx in the Information Age: A Media and Communication Studies Perspective on Capital Volume 1 (Routledge 2016) ISBN 978-1138948556
- Critical Theory of Communication: New Readings of Lukács, Adorno, Marcuse Honneth and Habermas in the Age of the Internet (University of Westminster Press, 2016) ISBN 978-1911534044
- Social Media: A Critical Introduction (Sage 2017, second edition) ISBN 978-1473966826
- The Online Advertising Tax as the Foundation of a Public Service Internet (University of Westminster Press, 2018) ISBN 978-1911534938
- Digital Demagogue: Authoritarian Capitalism in the Age of Trump and Twitter (Pluto Press, 2018) ISBN 0745337961
- Rereading Marx in the Age of Digital Capitalism (Pluto Press, 2019) ISBN 978-0745339993
- Nationalism on the Internet: Critical Theory and Ideology in the Age of Social Media and Fake News (Routledge, 2020) ISBN 978-0367357665
- Marxism: Karl Marx’s Fifteen Key Concepts for Cultural & Communication Studies (Routledge, 2020) ISBN 978-0367418779
- Communication and Capitalism: A Critical Theory (University of Westminster Press, 2020) ISBN 978-1912656714
- Marxist Humanism and Communication Theory. Media, Communication and Society Volume One (Routledge, 2021) ISBN 978-0367697129
- Social Media: A Critical Introduction (Sage, 2021, third edition) ISBN 978-1529752748
- Foundations of Critical Theory. Media, Communication and Society Volume Two (Routledge, 2021) ISBN 978-1032057897
- Communicating COVID-19. Everyday Life, Digital Capitalism, and Conspiracy Theories in Pandemic Times. SocietyNow Series (Emerald, 2021) ISBN 978-1801177238
- Foundations of Critical Theory (Routledge, 2022) ISBN 978-1032057897
- Digital Fascism (Routledge, 2022) ISBN 978-1032187600
- Digital Humanism (Emerald, 2022) ISBN 978-1803824222
- Digital Capitalism (Routledge, 2022) ISBN 978-1-032-11920-5
- Digital Ethics (Routledge, 2023) ISBN 978-1032246161
- Digital Democracy and the Digital Public Sphere (Routledge, 2023) ISBN 978-1032362724
- Digital Ethics (Routledge, 2023) ISBN 978-1032246161
- Media, Economy and Society: A Critical Introduction. Abingdon, Routledge 2024, ISBN 978-1-032-48875-2.
- Social Media: A Critical Introduction, London, Sage, 2024, fourth English edition, ISBN 978-1-5296-8499-5.
- World War and World Peace in the Age of Digital Capitalism. University of Westminster Press, London 2025, ISBN 978-1-915445-77-3 (Open Access).

== Edited Books and Collected Volumes ==
- Christian Fuchs & Klaus Unterberger, editors. 2021. The Public Service Media and Public Service Internet Manifesto (London: University of Westminster Press). The Public Service Media and Public Service Internet Manifesto
- Christian Fuchs, ed. 2021. Engels@200: Friedrich Engels in the Age of Digital Capitalism. tripleC: Communication, Capitalism & Critique 19 (1): 1–194. Published open access: Engels@200: Friedrich Engels in the Age of Digital Capitalism. (Full Issue in One PDF)
- Christian Fuchs, ed. 2020. Communicative Socialism/Digital Socialism. tripleC: Communication, Capitalism & Critique 18 (1): 1–285. Published open access: Special Issue: Communicative Socialism/Digital Socialism, edited by Christian Fuchs
- Christian Fuchs and Lara Monticelli, eds. 2018. Karl Marx @ 200. Debating Capitalism & Perspectives for the Future of Radical Theory. tripleC: Communication, Capitalism & Critique 16 (2): 406–741. Published open access: Marx @ 200: Debating Capitalism & Perspectives for the Future of Radical Theory (combined PDF of all articles)
- David Chandler and Christian Fuchs, eds. Digital Objects, Digital Subjects: Interdisciplinary Perspectives on Capitalism, Labour and Politics in the Age of Big Data (University of Westminster Press, 2019) ISBN 978-1912656202
- Jack Qiu and Christian Fuchs, eds. 2018. Ferments in the Field: The Past, Present and Future of Communication Studies (Special issue). Journal of Communication 68 (2): 219–451.
- Christian Fuchs and Vincent Mosco, eds. 2016. Marx and the Political Economy of the Media. Studies in Critical Social Sciences, Volume 79. Leiden: Brill. ISBN 978-9004291409 (Paperback: 2017. Chicago, IL: Haymarket Books, ISBN 978-1608467082).
- Christian Fuchs and Vincent Mosco, eds. 2016. Marx in the Age of Digital Capitalism. Studies in Critical Social Sciences, Volume 80. Leiden: Brill. ISBN 978-9004291386 (Paperback 2017. Chicago, IL: Haymarket Books, ISBN 978-1608467099).
- Eran Fisher and Christian Fuchs, eds. 2015. Reconsidering Value and Labour in the Digital Age. Basingstoke: Palgrave Macmillan. ISBN 978-1349570775
- Marisol Sandoval, Christian Fuchs, Jernej A. Prodnik, Sebastian Sevignani and Thomas Allmer, eds. 2014. Special Issue: Philosophers of the World Unite! Theorising Digital Labour and Virtual Work – Definitions, Dimensions and Forms. tripleC: Communication, Capitalism & Critique 12 (2): 464–801. Published open access: Philosophers of the World Unite! Theorising Digital Labour and Virtual Work – Definitions, Dimensions and Forms
- Christian Fuchs and Marisol Sandoval, eds. 2014. Critique, Social Media and the Information Society. New York: Routledge. ISBN 978-0415721080
- Daniel Trottier and Christian Fuchs, eds. 2014. Social Media, Politics and the State: Protests, Revolutions, Riots, Crime and Policing in the Age of Facebook, Twitter and YouTube. New York: Routledge. ISBN 978-0415749091
- Christian Fuchs and Vincent Mosco, eds. 2012. Marx is Back – The Importance of Marxist Theory and Research for Critical Communication Studies Today. tripleC – Open Access Journal for a Global Sustainable Information Society 10 (2): 127–632. Published open access: Available here
- Christian Fuchs, Kees Boersma, Anders Albrechtslund, Marisol Sandoval, eds. 2012. Internet and Surveillance. The Challenges of Web 2.0 and Social Media. New York: Routledge. ISBN 978-0415633642
- Fuchs, Christian and Göran Bolin, eds. 2012. Critical Theory and Political Economy of the Internet @ Nordmedia 2011. tripleC – Open Access Journal for a Global Sustainable Information Society 10 (1): 30–91. Published open access: Vol 10 No 1 (2012)| tripleC: Communication, Capitalism & Critique. Open Access Journal for a Global Sustainable Information Society
- Margit Appel, Ronald Blaschke, Christian Fuchs, Manfred Füllsack and Luise Gubitzer, eds. 2006. Grundeinkommen – In Freiheit tätig sein (Guaranteed Basic Income – Activity in Freedom). Berlin: Avinus. ISBN 3930064731
- Vladimir Arshinov and Christian Fuchs, eds. 2003. Causality, Emergence, Self-Organisation. Moscow: NIA-Priroda. ISBN 5956200065
- Christiane Floyd, Christian Fuchs, Wolfgang Hofkirchner, eds. 2002. Stufen zur Informationsgesellschaft. Festschrift zum 65. Geburtstag von Klaus Fuchs-Kittowski (Steps Towards the Information Society: Festschrift for Klaus Fuchs-Kittowski on the Occasion of his 65th Birthday). Vienna: Peter Lang. ISBN 978-3631376423

== Articles ==
- Christian Fuchs & Sebastian Sevignani, tripleC, vol. 11, no 2, 2013, p. 237–229
