= Simon Buckingham =

English information society theorist

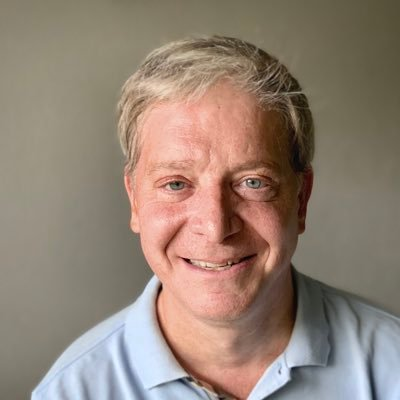
- Born: Simon David Buckingham; Oxford, England
- Occupations: Information society theorist; Entrepreneur
- Known for: Originator of the term "unorganisation"

Simon David Buckingham (born in Oxford, England) is an English information society theorist and the originator of the term "unorganisation".

== Biography ==
Buckingham created and published in 1996 the unorganisation philosophy. Subsequently, he became a serial entrepreneur.

=== Mobile Lifestreams and Mobile Streams ===
He founded his first start up in 1999, Mobile Lifestreams, which started out as a research and consulting company. Buckingham authoring the "Yes 2 SMS" report that accurately predicted the success of the SMS text messaging service. Buckingham registered and launched the domain name and service ringtones.com. Mobile Lifestreams was renamed Mobile Streams and completed its initial public offering in February 2006 (LSE:MOS). At the same time, Liberty Media, the U.S. content company became a strategic investor in the company.

Buckingham led Mobile Streams as chief executive for over a decade, during which the company established subsidiaries in a number of overseas markets and formed partnerships with third-party content and technology providers.

In 2019, Buckingham founded Nonvoice, a Florida-based technology company focused on developing applications and services using 5G and augmented reality technologies. The company subsequently launched Alive 5G, a consumer portal designed to aggregate 5G-enabled augmented reality applications.

=== Zoombak ===
In January 2006, Buckingham become the CEO of Zoombak, a provider of GPS devices and services for family safety and enterprise applications. Zoombak was owned by Liberty Media but managed by Buckingham and Mobile Streams. More than 100,000 Zoombak devices had been shipped by October 2009.

=== Appitalism ===
In 2010, Buckingham founded his third start up in New York, Appitalism, an open app store, that launched in September 2010 in 51 countries. Discussing the venture, Buckingham said the idea grew out of his earlier work with ringtones.com and Mobile Streams, drawing a parallel between the decline of the ringtone business and the emergence of the smartphone app market, and described Appitalism's aim as bringing together the "islands of apps" scattered across different device platforms and stores.

=== Nonvoice ===
In 2019, Buckingham founded Nonvoice, a Florida-based technology company focused on developing applications and services using 5G and augmented reality technologies. The company subsequently launched Alive 5G, a consumer portal designed to aggregate 5G-enabled augmented reality applications.
