= Yoneji Masuda =

Japanese sociologist (1905–1995)

- 増田米治

Academic work
- Discipline: sociology
- Institutions: Aomori University
- Main interests: information society

Yoneji Masuda (増田米治, Masuda Yoneji; 1905–1995) was a Japanese sociologist whose early ideas on information and communication helped him become known as the "Father of the Information Society". His professional and academic activity played a crucial role in the strategic definition of a model for Japanese technological society, and he was one of the pioneers in conceptualizing the idea of information society.

== Life and career ==
Masuda worked in various programs of the Japanese Ministries of Labour and Education to improve and streamline production practices and training of the Japanese population. He was director of the Institute for the Development of the Uses of Computers in Japan and the founder and president of the Institute for Informatization of the Society. He served as a professor at the Aomori University and director of the Japan Society of Creativity.

== Theory ==
Masuda was one of the major candidates who attributed credit for coining the term information society. Although his book that uses such terms in the title dates back to 1980, there was already a public debate on the issue in the 1950s and 1960s in Japan. Thus, some authors suggest that the first scholars of the concept of Information Society appear in Japan : the book published by Yoneji Masuda in 1980 titled Johoka shakai, which means the higher stage of social evolution, from the perspective of the analogy with biological evolution. From post-industrial society to information society. The fifth chapter of it was entitled to turn the information age: quiet transformation of society. In it, Masuda tells of the birth of an era of information, focusing on computer technology, which operates in conjunction with communications technology. An information age is the time period during which takes place innovation information technology, becomes latent force of social transformation, able to cause an expansion in the quality of information and a large increase scale storage of information.

This was, for the author, the information society, focusing on computer technology, which would have a much more decisive impact on human society that the Industrial Revolution which began with the invention of the steam engine, because the fundamental role of the computer is to replace and amplify human mental work, while the basic function of steam machinery was replacement and amplification of physical work.

Masuda spoke also of the possibility of a highly organic society, pointing out the similarity of environmental information system of communications technology and computer information systems to organic bodies, which would suggest something important to the vision of the (then) future information society. On this basis, one could hypothesize that the future information society would be a highly integrated society, like an organism. It would be a complex multi-centered society in which many systems are connected and integrated by information networks. Further, this would be a dynamic society able to respond more quickly and appropriately to contemporary society-then-to the changing environment, and thus the information society of the future would appear to us as a society with a highly organic information space, linked by a network of cognitive information proaction dense mesh (feedforward).

Writing about the social impact of the information age, Masuda understood to mean not only that would cause a great socioeconomic impact on contemporary industrial society, prove a force for social change powerful enough to transform human society into an absolutely new form, which is the information society. Overall, the innovative technology would change the social and economic systems through the following three phases:

- Phase 1. – In which technology does the work previously done for humans based on automation.
- Phase 2. – In which technology makes possible the realization of a work that man could never do before. Knowledge creation, leading to enlargement of the mental work of man.
- Phase 3. – In which socio-economic structures are transformed into new social and economic systems, a result of the first two phases of development.

The futuristic vision of Masuda of goes further: in the global information society, all citizens will be bound together by a global network of information and knowledge, leading to the formation of a global consciousness, which will sweep away the differences of cultures, interests and nationalities. In predicting the introduction of a general education system, the disappearance of illiteracy, the advent of world peace and human happiness, Masuda does not restrict his futuristic vision to those social sectors or countries actively participating in industry or in services information, but predicts a real New World Order that he calls "Computopía"

== Publications ==
Masuda authored several books on technology and society. In 1968 he published An Introduction to the Information Society (Tokyo: Perikan-Sha, 1968), the forerunner of his most famous book, The Information Society as Post-Industrial Society (Tokyo: Institute for the Information Society, 1980). The latter has been translated into many languages, including Portuguese (A Sociedade Sociedade da Informação as Post-Industrial, Rio / Embratel, Rio de Janeiro, 1980), and Spanish (with a title that changed 'information' to 'computer': The information society as post-industrial society, Fundesco-Tecnos, Madrid, 1984).
