= Jan van Dijk =

Jan A.G.M. van Dijk
- Born: 1952 (age 73–74)
- Occupation: Professor emeritus
- Years active: 1970s - present
- Employer: University of Twente
- Known for: writing about sociology

Jan A.G.M. van Dijk (born 1952) is professor emeritus of communication science at the University of Twente in the Netherlands, where he still works. His chair was called The Sociology of the Information Society. He lectured on the social aspects of the information society. Van Dijk was also Chair of the Centre for e-Government Studies and an advisor of and many governments and departments, including the European Commission and several Dutch ministries, city departments, and political parties.

== Research ==
=== Methodology of critical social research (1977–1985) ===
Van Dijk started his career as a methodologist of critical social research at the end of the 1970s at the University of Utrecht. His dissertation was "Western Marxism in Social Science" (1984). It analyzed the research tradition practiced at Western universities in the 1970s and 1980s. Next, van Dijk concentrated on principles of applied social research as a combination of observation and agent of social change. He experimented with a Delphi method among employees in corporations. In this process, he first observed the effects of the introduction of computing and the Internet in the work environment and decided to explore its effect on individuals, organizations, and societies.

=== Digital media (1985–) ===
Van Dijk started his digital media research with an interdisciplinary overview of the consequences of digital media and networks on people, society and organizations. The overview focused on economic, sociological, political, cultural, psychological, and legal consequences as well as relevant policy approaches. It was eventually published as De Netwerkmaatschappij (English: Network Society (1991)). Three Dutch editions followed in 1994, 1997, and 2001.

In the 1980s Van Dijk initiated the term Network Society, which he defined as a "modern society (after the industrial revolution) with an infrastructure of social and media networks that organize this society at every level: individual, group/organization and society". He claimed that in Western countries, the individual, connected by networks, are the basic unit of society, while in Eastern societies, interconnected groups (family, community or work team) form the basic unit.

From 1999, van Dijk extended and updated his concept in four English editions of The Network Society (1999, 2006, 2012 and 2020). In the 2020 edition, the new trends are the emergence of artificial intelligence, big data, blockchain, Bitcoin and platform economy. Between 2000 and 2020, his research on networks and digital media or new media focused on digital or Internet democracy, e-government, the digital divide and digital skills.

His main books on these topics are Digital Democracy (2000) and Internet and Democracy (2018), The Deepening Divide (2005), Digital Skills (2014) and The Digital Divide (2020). The two books on digital democracy attempt to show that digital media mainly changes the form of the democratic processes, but not the measure of political participation and the nature of the political system. The books on the digital divide argue that digital inequality reinforces existing social, economic and cultural inequality. The main argument is that unequal access to digital media, inadequate digital skills and structural differences in usages of these media by different social categories amplify existing inequalities.

=== Power & Technology ===
In 2020 Van Dijk began working on an overall work called Power & Technology, combining theories of social and natural power to explain the use of technology in human history. The book is an attempt to offer a general theory of power that combines natural power, technical power, and social power. Artifacts are assumed to be actors too (they work as "actants"). The general definition of power in this book is:

"Power is the capacity of a unit (people or artifacts) in a relationship with other people or artifacts to cause them to do things that they otherwise would not have done, or to prevent them from doing things they might otherwise have done in some social or natural context."

The nine capacities developed in this book apply to natural, technical and social power. They are force, construction (design), coercion, domination, discipline, dependency, information, persuasion and authority. The first three are material power, the next three physical power, and the last three mental power.

== Publications ==
=== Monographs ===
- The Network Society: Social Aspects of New Media (1999, 2nd edition 2005, 3rd edition 2012) ISBN 978-1-4462-4896-6, (original Dutch edition 1991)
- The Deepening Divide: Inequality in the Information Society (2005) ISBN 1-4129-0403-X
- Digital Democracy: Issues of Theory and Practice (2001, with Kenneth Hacker) ISBN 0-7619-6217-4
- Information and Communication Technology in Organizations, Adoption, Implementation, Use and Effects (2005, with Harry Bouwman, Bart van den Hooff and Lidwien van de Wijngaert) ISBN 1-4129-0090-5
- Digital Skills, Unlocking the information society (2014, with Alexander van Deursen) ISBN 978-1-137-43702-0
- Internet and Democracy in the Network Society (2018), with Kenneth Hacker ISBN 978-0-8153-6302-6
- The Digital Divide (2020). Cambridge: Polity Press. ISBN 978-1-5095-3446-3
