= Frank Webster (sociologist) =

British sociologist

Frank Webster (born 27 September 1950) is a British sociologist. His critical writing on the "information society" has been translated into many languages, widely discussed and criticized. In Theories of the Information Society, he examined six analytically separable conceptions of the information society, arguing that all are suspect, so much so that the idea of an information society cannot be easily sustained.

== Biography ==
Frank Webster comes from New Coundon (locally referred to as Coundon Station), a mining village in Durham, England where he was raised and educated. He graduated from Durham University in 1974 with a degree in sociology. He completed his studies at the London School of Economics and has worked in several universities, at home and abroad. He joined City full-time in 2003 from the University of Birmingham. He served as Head of the Department of Sociology at City University London from 2008 to 2012 and retired in 2013.

== Works ==
His research since the 1970s has centred on information and communications trends, and has included conceptual analysis and critique, as well as studies of higher education, the effects of advanced technologies on libraries, urban change, and new media. He has more recently worked on Information War and was involved in researching Internet Activism by examining the anti-war movement and its adoption of ICTs. This work is situated in a context of interest in democratisation and information trends, an interest manifested in his teaching at City University London. A book from this project appeared in 2008 titled, Anti-War Activism: New Media and Protest in the Information Age (Palgrave), written with Kevin Gillan and Jenny Pickerill.

Webster has published books on many aspects of contemporary social change. He has resisted the view that the Information society is radically new, insisting on the primacy of continuities and consolidations of established trends. He conceives today's ‘informational capitalism’ as a development from corporate capitalism and, before that, laissez-faire capitalism, that advances principles of market society such as private ownership, competition, profitability, commodification, ability to pay, and the centrality of wage labor.

He wrote a Luddite analysis of Information Technology with Kevin Robins in the early 1980s that was one of the first book-length critiques of optimistic analyses of computer and telecommunications technologies. More recently, he has used the term Information Society, though this seems to contradict his early hostility to the idea.

He has often drawn attention to the dark sides of informational developments, especially the military dimensions. He has adopted the concept of Information War to examine the changing information environment of recent wars.

A much expanded 4th edition of Theories of the Information Society appeared in 2014.

== Publications ==
- The New Photography: Responsibility in Visual Communication Calder, 1980
- Information Technology: A Luddite Analysis. (with Kevin Robins) New Jersey, 1986
- The Technical Fix: Computers, Industry and Education (with Kevin Robins) 1989
- Theories of the Information Society 1995, 4th edition 2014
- Information Society: Conception and Critique in Hall, Executive editor: Allen Kent; Administrative editor: Carolyn M. (1996). Encyclopedia of library and information science. Supplement 21. Vol. 58 (1. print. ed.). New York: M. Dekker. pp. 74–112. ISBN 082472058X.
- The Postmodern University? Contested Visions of Higher Education (with A.Smith) 1997
- Times of the Technoculture: from the Information Society to the Virtual Life (with Kevin Robins) 1999
- Understanding Contemporary Society: Theories of the Present (with G.Browning and A.Halcli) 2000
- Culture and Politics in the Information Age: A New Politics? 2001
- The Virtual University: Knowledge, Markets and Management (with Kevin Robins)2002
- The Intensification of Surveillance: crime, terrorism and warfare in the information era. (with Kirstie Ball) 2003
- The Information Society Reader 2004
- Manuel Castells: Masters of Modern Social Thought, 3 volumes (with Basil Dimitriou) 2004
- Journalists under Fire: Information War and Journalistic Practices 2006 (with Howard Tumber)
- Anti-War Activism: New Media and Protest in the Information Age 2008 (with Kevin Gillan and Jennifer Pickerill)
- Kevin Robins and Frank Webster (1988). "Cybernetic Capitalism: Information, Technology, Everyday Life," in: Vincent Mosko & Janet Wasko (eds.), The Political Economy of Information, Madison: The University of Wisconsin Press, pp. 45–75. Online
