= TripleC =

tripleC
- Discipline: Information studies; media studies; sociology
- Language: English
- Edited by: Christian Fuchs; Marisol Sandoval

Publication details
- History: 2003–present
- Publisher: tripleC (United Kingdom)
- Frequency: Biannual
- Open access: Yes

Standard abbreviations
- ISO 4: TripleC

Indexing
- ISSN: 1726-670X

Links
- Journal homepage; Online access; Online archive

tripleC: Communication, Capitalism & Critique is a biannual peer-reviewed open access academic journal covering communication studies, media studies, sociology of technology/communication/media/culture, critical digital sociology, information science/studies and political economy of media/communication/culture/Internet from the perspective of critical theory. tripleC is an open access journal focused on the critical study of capitalism and communication. It was established in 2003 as tripleC: Cognition, Communication, Cooperation. Journal for a Global Sustainable Information Society, obtaining its current name in 2013. It is published in the United Kingdom as not-for-profit project The editors-in-chief are Christian Fuchs (University of Westminster) and Marisol Sandoval (City University London). The journal uses the Creative Commons CC-BY-NC-ND licence for its content.
