= Takashi Masuda (computer scientist) =

Japanese computer scientist

Takashi Masuda (益田 隆司, MASUDA Takashi, born 1939) is a Japanese computer scientist. He was born in Hagi City, Yamaguchi Prefecture in 1939.

Masuda graduated from the University of Tokyo in 1963, and received his MS degree in 1956 there. From 1956 to 1977, he worked at Hitachi's Central Research Center and then Systems Laboratory, studying from 1969 at Carnegie Mellon University's Computer Science School on a sabbatical. He received his PhD from University of Tokyo. His doctorate thesis was on the "Analysis and Evaluation of the Computer System Which Uses Virtual Memory".

From 1977 Masuda taught at the College of Information Science in University of Tsukuba. In 1988 he moved to University of Tokyo's School of Science as a professor of computer science and became the dean of the (Graduate) School of Science there in 1995. He then moved to University of Electro-Communications, Tokyo, as a professor in 2000 and became the president there in 2004. He retired from the university in 2008.

From 2003 to 2005, Masuda served as president of the Information Processing Society of Japan. From 2008, he has served as an executive director of the Funai Foundation for Information Technology, which helps those who study abroad to get Ph.D.
