= Aomori University =

Higher education institution in Aomori Prefecture, Japan

- 青森大学
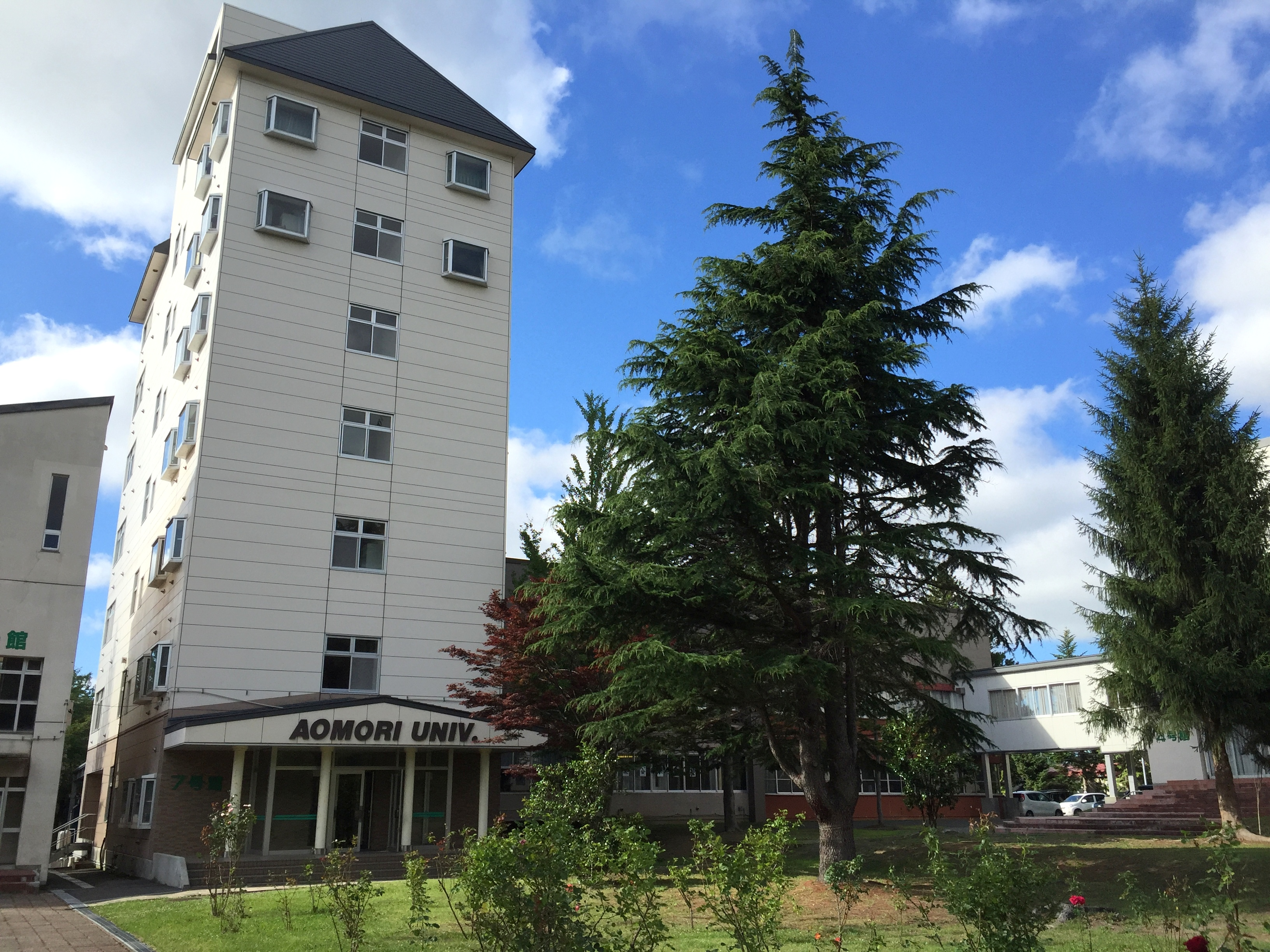
- Aomori University in Aomori, Japan.
- Type: Private
- Established: 1968
- President: Yasufumi Sakitani
- Location: Aomori, Aomori, Japan; 40°47′00″N 140°46′46″E
- Website: Official website
- Japan Aomori Prefecture

Aomori University (青森大学, Aomori Daigaku) is a private university located in the city of Aomori, Japan, founded in 1968. The university has three major areas of study: business administration, sociology, and software and information technology.
