= Vincent Mosco =

American-Canadian sociologist (1948–2024)

Vincent Mosco (July 23, 1948 – February 9, 2024) was an American Canadian sociologist, political economist, and communication researcher. He was best known for his critical analyses of telecommunications policy, cyberspace, and the social implications of information technology.

== Early life and education ==
Mosco was born in New York City, the son of Frank Mosco, a lithographer, and Rose Mosco, a homemaker. He earned his Bachelor of Arts degree summa cum laude from Georgetown University in 1970, where he was inducted into Phi Beta Kappa. He went on to complete his Ph.D. at Harvard University in 1975, supported by a National Science Foundation fellowship from 1970 to 1973.

== Academic career ==
Mosco began his academic career as an assistant professor of sociology and department chair at the University of Massachusetts, Lowell (1975–1977). He subsequently held positions at Georgetown University as associate professor of sociology (1978–1981) and Temple University as associate professor of communications (1981–1984).

In 1984, Mosco moved to Canada, joining Queen's University at Kingston, Ontario, where he served as associate professor (1984–1987) and professor of sociology (1987–1989). From 1989, he was a professor of communication at Carleton University in Ottawa, Ontario.

He held the position of Canada Research Chair in Communication and Society at Queen's University at Kingston from 2003 to 2011 and later became professor emeritus of Sociology. He was appointed Distinguished Professor of Communication at the New Media Centre, Fudan University in Shanghai, China in 2016.

== Research positions and consultancies ==
Throughout his career, Mosco held numerous research fellowships and consulting positions, including:

- Postdoctoral research fellow at Harvard University (1975–1977)
- U.S. Office of Telecommunications Policy (1977–1978)
- National Academy of Sciences' Commission on Sociotechnical Systems (1981–1982)
- Research affiliate, Harvard University Program on Information Resources Policy
- Consultant to the National Telecommunications and Information Administration (1980–1981)
- Consultant to U.S. Congress, Office of Technology Assessment (1986–1988)
- Consultant to Government of Canada, Ministry of Communication (1987–1988)

== Scholarly work ==
Mosco's research focused on the political economy of communication, telecommunications policy, and the social and cultural dimensions of digital technology. His work was characterized by critical perspectives on the role of technology in society and skepticism toward technological utopianism.

== International engagement ==
In addition to his North American academic positions, Mosco developed significant international scholarly connections, particularly with China and Brazil. As Distinguished Professor at Fudan University's New Media Centre in Shanghai, he co-directed and lectured at the annual Summer School, addressing topics including neoliberalism, artificial intelligence, and the metaverse. His participation in research groups in Brazil and China led to several collaborative publications and edited volumes.

== Major themes ==
In his 1982 book Pushbutton Fantasies: Critical Perspectives on Videotex and Information Technology, Mosco examined early visions of interactive information technology, anticipating many developments that would later emerge with the Internet. His 1989 work The Pay-per Society: Computers and Communication in the Information Age explored the commodification of information and communication services.

His influential 1996 book The Political Economy of Communication: Rethinking and Renewal helped establish political economy as a central framework for analyzing media and communication systems. A revised second edition was published in 2009, updating his analysis for the digital age.

In The Digital Sublime: Myth, Power, and Cyberspace (2004), Mosco critically examined three prevailing myths about cyberspace: the end of politics, the end of geography, and the end of history. He contextualized digital communication within the broader history of communication technologies and cautioned against uncritical acceptance of digital utopianism. The book won the 2005 Gary A. Olson Award for outstanding book in rhetoric and cultural studies.

His later works formed an ambitious trilogy on the social impacts of new technologies. To the Cloud: Big Data in a Turbulent World (2014), the first volume, examined the political economy of cloud computing and big data. This was followed by Becoming Digital: Toward a Post-Internet Society (2017), which addressed the convergence of cloud computing, big data analytics, and the Internet of Things. The trilogy concluded with The Smart City in a Digital World (2019), which analyzed the political economic and cultural significance of applying advanced technologies to manage and govern urban regions. At the time of his death, Mosco had completed Critical Communication: A Memoir.

== Selected publications ==
Throughout his career, Mosco published over 200 publications.

Books

- The Regulation of Broadcasting in the United States: A Comparative Analysis (1975)
- Broadcasting in the United States: Innovative Challenge and Organizational Control (1979)
- Pushbutton Fantasies: Critical Perspectives on Videotex and Information Technology (1982)
- The Pay-per Society: Computers and Communication in the Information Age (1989)
- Doing It Right with Computer Communication (1994)
- Will Computer Communication End Geography? (1995)
- The Political Economy of Communication: Rethinking and Renewal (1996; second edition 2009)
- The Digital Sublime: Myth, Power, and Cyberspace (2004)
- The Laboring of Communication (with Catherine McKercher, 2008)
- To the Cloud: Big Data in a Turbulent World (2014)
- Becoming Digital: Toward a Post-Internet Society (2017)
- The Smart City in a Digital World (2019)
- Critical Communication: A Memoir (2024)

Edited volumes

- Labor, the Working Class, and the Media (with Janet Wasko, 1983)
- Policy Research in Telecommunications (1984)
- Changing Patterns of Communication Control (with Janet Wasko, 1984)
- Popular Culture and Media Events (with Janet Wasko, 1985)
- The Political Economy of Information (with Janet Wasko, 1988)
- Democratic Communication in the Information Age (with Janet Wasko, 1992)
- Illuminating the Blindspots: Essays Honoring Dallas W. Smythe (with Janet Wasko and Manjunath Pendakur, 1993)
- Continental Order?: Integrating North America for Cybercapitalism (with Dan Schiller, 2001)
- Knowledge Workers in the Information Society (with Catherine McKercher, 2007)
- Getting the Message: Communications Workers and Global Value Chains (with Catherine McKercher and Ursula Huws, 2010)
- Critical Studies in Communication and Society (with Jin Cao and Leslie Regan Shade, 2014)
- Marx and the Political Economy of the Media (with Christian Fuchs, 2015)
- Marx in the Age of Digital Capitalism (with Christian Fuchs, 2015)
- The Political Economy of Communication: Case Studies from China (2018)
- Critical Communication Research: Western Perspectives (with Cao Jin, 2019)
- Political Economy of Journalism: New (and old) Logics of Production and Consumption (with Jacqueline Lima Dourado, Denise Maria Moura da Silva Lopes, Juliana Fernandes Teixeira, and Renan da Silva Marques, 2019)
- Critical Perspectives on New Media: Challenging the Neo-Liberal World Order (with Cao Jin, 2022)

His works have been translated into Chinese, Spanish, Korean, Hungarian, and Persian.

Selected journal articles and book chapters

Mosco authored over 200 journal articles and book chapters throughout his career. Notable publications include:

Recent work (2020s)

- "Into the Metaverse: Technical Challenges, Social Problems, Utopian Visions, and Policy Principles," Javnost – The Public, 30(2), 2023
- "Political Economies of Media Technologies," *Oxford Research Encyclopedia of Communication, revised 2023
- "The Laboring of Labor Communication Research," Handbook of Digital Labor, 2023
- "Infrastructures of (In)justice: A Dialogue with Vincent Mosco," in Digital (In)Justice in the Smart City, 2023

Major contributions (2010s)

- "The Laboring of Artificial Intelligence: A Review," IEEE Technology and Society, 2019
- "The History of the Internet under Surveillance Capitalism: A Review Essay," Science as Culture, 2019
- "A Critical Perspective on the Post-Internet World," Javnost - The Public, 2018
- "Political Economies of Media Technologies," Oxford Encyclopedia of Communication and Critical Studies, 2018
- "Weaponized Drones in the Military Information Society: A Review Essay," Science as Culture, 2017
- "Marx is Back, But Which One? On Knowledge Labour and Media Practice," 2015
- "Marx in the Cloud," in Marx in the Age of Digital Capitalism, 2015
- "Introduction: Marx is Back – The Importance of Marxist Theory and Research for Critical Communication Studies Today" (with Christian Fuchs), tripleC, 2012

Foundational works (1980s-2000s)

- "Knowledge Workers of the World! Unite?," Communication, Culture & Critique, 2008
- "Cyberspace and the End of Politics" (with Derek Foster), Journal of Communication Inquiry, 2001
- "The Mythology of Telecommunications Deregulation," Journal of Communication, 1990
- "Toward a Theory of the State and Telecommunications Policy," Journal of Communication, 1988
- "Critical Research and the Role of Labor," Journal of Communication, 1983
- "Critical Theory and Electronic Media" (with Andrew Herman), Theory and Society, 1981

Mosco contributed to numerous encyclopedias and handbooks, including the International Encyclopedia of Communication, Oxford Bibliographies, and various specialized volumes on political economy, labor, and digital media.

== Awards and honours ==
- Woodrow Wilson Fellow
- National Science Foundation Fellow (1970–1973)
- National Research Council Fellow (1981–1982)
- Sharpe Lecturer, University of Toronto (1991)
- David Dunton Lecturer, Carleton University (1996)
- Teaching Excellence Award, Carleton University Students' Association (2000)
- Dallas W. Smythe Award for outstanding achievement in communication research, Union for Democratic Communication (2004)
- Gary A. Olson Award for outstanding book in rhetoric and cultural studies for The Digital Sublime (2005)
- Professional Freedom and Responsibility Award (with Catherine McKercher), Association for Education in Journalism and Mass Communication (2014)
- C. Edwin Baker Award for outstanding scholarship in media, markets, and democracy, International Communication Association (2019)

== Professional affiliations ==
Mosco was active in several professional organizations, including:

- International Association for Mass Communication Researchers (chair of Political Economy Section)
- Union for Democratic Communications (founding member)
- Phi Beta Kappa

He served as contributing editor to the Journal of Communication and on the editorial boards of Media, Culture, and Society; Journal of Sport and Social Issues; and Science as Culture.

He was also a research affiliate with the Harvard Program on Information Resources Policy and served as a consultant to trade unions and worker organizations in Canada and the United States.

== Personal life ==
Mosco married Catherine McKercher, a Canadian journalism professor, on May 17, 1980. They had two daughters, Rosemary and Madeline.

== Death ==
Mosco died on February 9, 2024. His death was marked by numerous tributes in academic journals recognizing his significant contributions to communication studies and political economy.
