= Hauben =

Hauben is a surname. Notable people with the surname include:

- Daniel Hauben (born 1956), American painter
- Lawrence Hauben (1931–1985), American actor and screenwriter
- Léopold Hauben (1912-?), Belgian fencer
- Michael Hauben (1973–2001), American internet theorist and author
