= Social Age =

== Introduction and Definition ==
The Social Age is the societal era used to describe today's world of communication, and developed following the creation of the Information Age, which was defined as the era in which information was shifting from paper-based sharing to information being shared through technology. The World Wide Web contributed significantly to the Information Age with most information being free on the internet. The Social Age can be defined as the evolution of social interactions because of the advancements of the internet and the development of social media. This differs from the sociological term "social aging", which is defined by the change in a person's social life as they age. According to Dr. Julian Stodd, an internet writer and influence who popularized the recognition of this era, with electronic networks, social media applications, and websites, communication has shifted focus from accessing information on the internet to mass collaboration and creation of communities.

With this change, influence and interactions are shaped more strongly by social networks and participation instead of institutional authority.

Social Age is divergent from the Information Age as it gives more prominence to social factors when adopting and/or extending technology and information. It further broadens the definition of Attention Age because the Social Age focuses on many forms of societal interactions including online relationships, collaboration and sharing.

== Historical Development and Origins ==
The Social Age is generally understood as emerging from the preceding Information Age, a period characterized by the widespread use of information technology such as mobile phones and laptops in the mid-20^{th} century. The invention of these technologies led to the creation of the ARPANET in 1969, which later evolved into the Internet, enabling unprecedented access to information and digital communication.

While the Information age emphasized the efficient transmission of information from producers, media companies, to consumers, individuals, the Social Age represents a shift toward more interactive and networked forms of engagement. The Internet, in this context, functions as an enabling infrastructure rather than the defining feature of the Social Age itself.

The emergence of social media platforms in the early 2000s is widely cited as a key turning point in the development of the Social Age. Platforms such as YouTube, X, Instagram, among others, facilitated new modes of communication by allowing users to create, share and distribute content globally. These platforms contributed to what has been described as “democratisation of publishing”, whereby individuals gained the ability to create and share content without relying on traditional media institutions.

Despite its growing use in professional discourse, the concept of Social Age remains relatively underdeveloped in academic literature, with only limited references. As a result, its definition and scope continue to evolve.

== Interpersonal Relationships in the Social Age ==
=== Overview ===
The social age marks a new distinct method and function of communication. It has been primarily constructed by younger generations such as Gen Z and Gen Alpha as they are the most adept at navigating the social networks of the internet. As such, the values that the social age is built on will be the values of these younger generations. Gen Z and Gen Alpha have been distinguished as having values that center others and society, restraining individuality and maintaining social order. A key distinction between the social age and the information age is that the information age was centered around the new expansive access to information, the social age uses the digital structures of the information age to communicate with each other, introducing an entirely new social environment.

=== Interpersonal Relationships Within the Broader Community ===
The increasingly smaller nature of technology and its relative portability means that the social age comes with someone wherever they go. It has become an inextricable part of society as smartphones have become necessary for daily life. Internet communication has become a driving part of social evolution. Social media has become a widespread, diffuse, borderless landscape that disadvantages one not to partake in. The social age requires social availability; the someone is constantly accessible through message or email. Social media also means constantly being updated on others' lives through stories or posts. As a society curated information about each other is now just as widespread as academic information that got freed in the information age.

Choosing not to partake in social media can then put someone at a disadvantage as they are no longer being updated about the newest slang and trends. The social age does not stay on social media; it affects how interpersonal interactions happen in person as the language created on social media is integrated into the everyday lexicon.

Additionally, the social age has led to new ways of learning. Increasingly, people have begun to trust internet sources more as the number of creators centered around sharing current events has grown. Most consumers of self-published content believe that it can make them smarter. However, this shares an inverse relationship with education level: the greater the level of education completed the less likely someone is to believe that they can gain knowledge from social media.

=== Interpersonal Communication Among Friends ===
Social media, as a product from the social age has transformed interpersonal communication. Traditional barriers such as geographical proximity have been reduced, while the frequency and immediacy of communication have been increased due to the accessibility and convenience of these platforms.

These developments have both positive and negatives effects on interpersonal relationships. On one hand, social media facilitates communication among individuals who are geographically dispersed, enabling people to maintain relationships with family members and acquaintances across long distances (Internet influences on communities). It also supports the formation and maintenance of friendships, including those that originate entirely online. Additionally, social media lowers barriers to entry for participation in communities, allowing individuals to connect with others who share similar interests, identities, or experiences (Internet influences on communities).

On the other hand, communication mediated through online platforms may increase the likelihood of misinterpretation and miscommunication due to the absence of nonverbal cues and reduced contextual information typically present in face-to-face interactions. (Interpersonal Communication and Social Media ) Furthermore, online communication enables individuals to disengage from interactions with relative ease, such as by ceasing to respond or restricting access through platform features (e.g., blocking cite User blocking on social media), which may facilitate avoidance of interpersonal conflict.

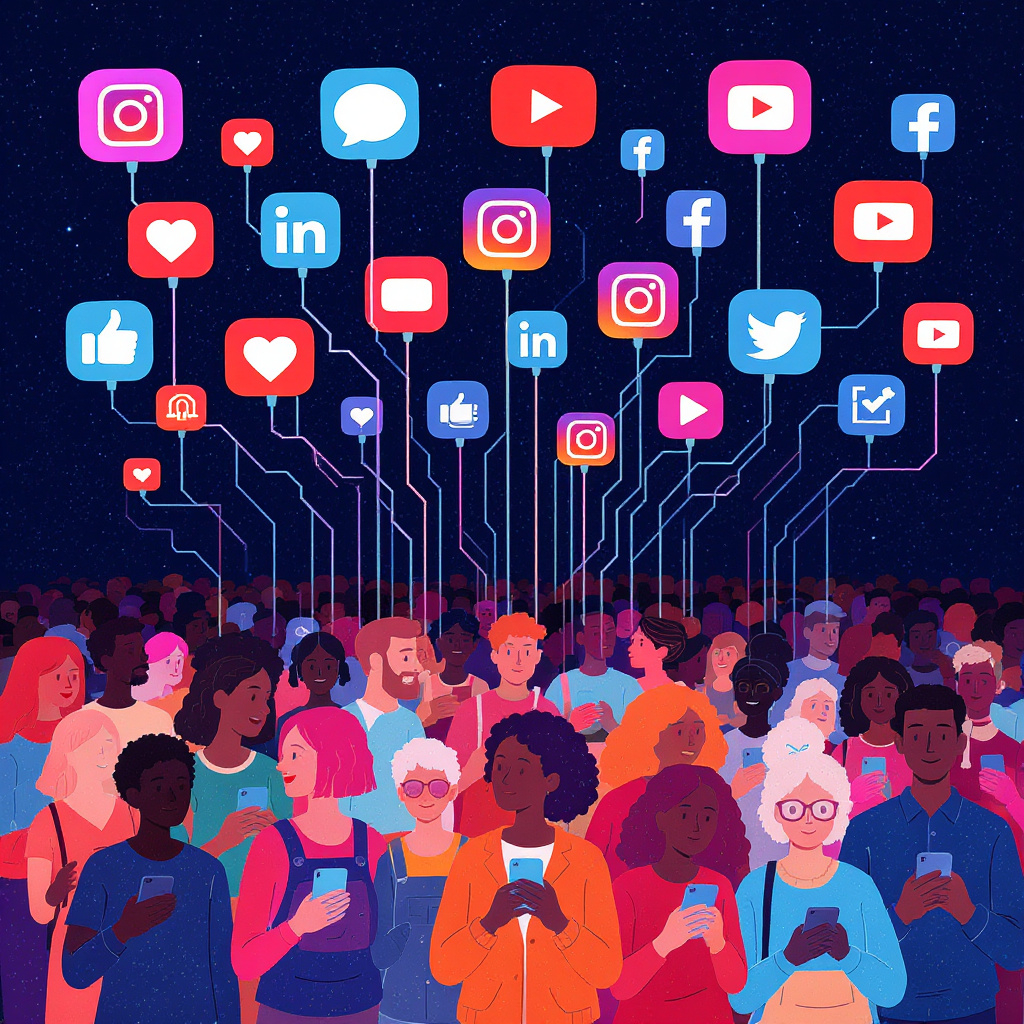
Social Media has an influence on everyday connectivity

== See also ==
- Digital citizen
- Information Age
- Information society
- Netizen
- Network society
- Social media
- Social networking service
- Social innovation
- Social technology
- Sociotechnology
- Technological innovation
- Technology and society
