= Netizen =

Person involved in internet communities

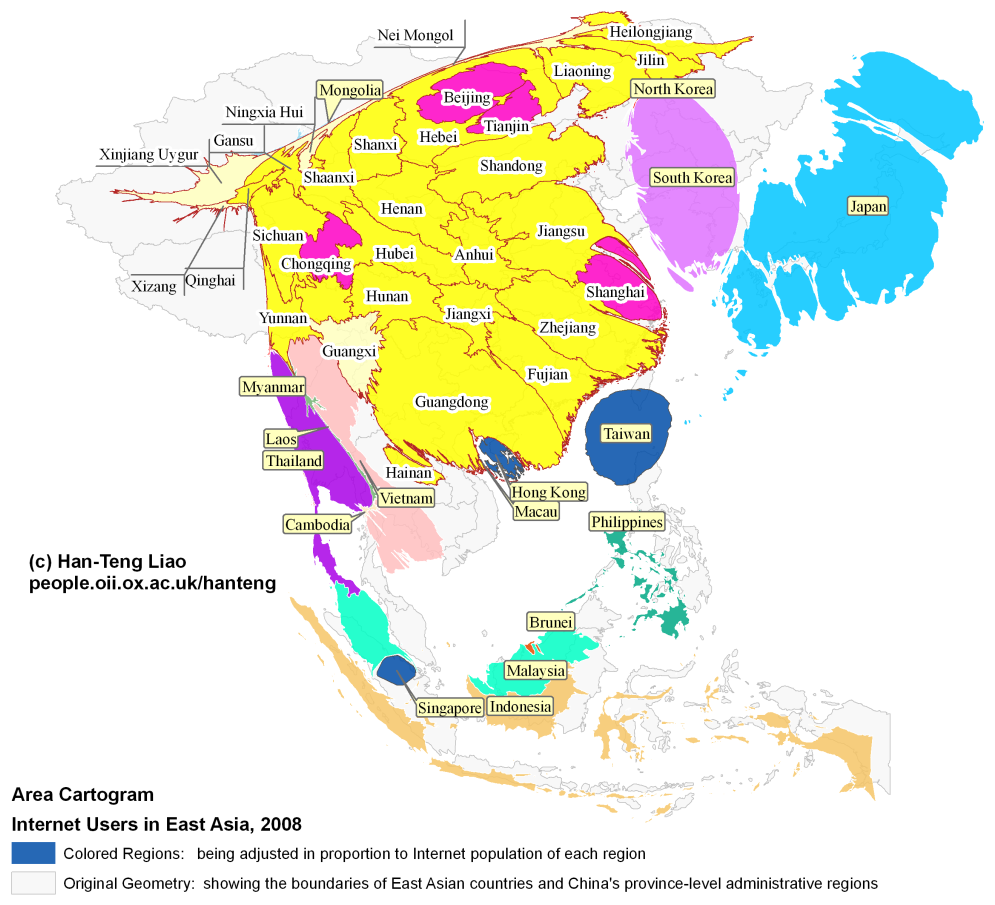
Area cartogram showing Internet users in East Asia, 2008

The term netizen is a portmanteau of the English words internet and citizen, as in a "citizen of the net" or "net citizen." It describes a person actively involved in online communities or the Internet in general.

The term also commonly implies an interest and active engagement in improving the internet, making it an intellectual and a social resource, or its surrounding political structures, especially in regard to open access, net neutrality and free speech. The term was widely adopted in the mid-1990s as a way to describe those who inhabit the new geography of the internet. Internet pioneer and author Michael F. Hauben is credited with coining and popularizing the term.

== Determining factor ==
In general, any individual who has access to the internet has the potential to be classified as a netizen. In the 21st century, this is made possible by the global connectivity of the internet. People can physically be located in one country but connected to most of the world via a global network.

There is a clear distinction between netizens and people who come online to use the internet. A netizen is described as an individual who actively seeks to contribute to the development of the internet. Netizens are not individuals who go online for personal gain or profit, but instead actively seeks to make the internet a better place.

A term used to classify internet users who do not actively contribute to the development of the internet is "lurker". Lurkers cannot be classified as netizens, as although they do not actively harm the internet, they do not contribute either.

Besides, lurkers seemed to be more critical of the technological elements enabling communities whereas posters appeared to be more critical of users who hampered community creation by making rude or unpleasant comments. Additionally, discussions indicate that both lurkers and posters had distinct motives for lurking and might modify their engagement behaviours based on how they understand the community from various online groups, despite the fact that engagement between those who post and those who lurk was different in the communities studied.

== In China ==
In Mandarin Chinese, the terms wǎngmín (simplified Chinese: 网民; traditional Chinese: 網民; lit. 'netizen' or 'net folks') and wǎngyǒu (simplified Chinese: 网友; traditional Chinese: 網友; lit. 'net friend' or 'net mate') are commonly used terms meaning "internet users". The English word netizen is used by mainland China-based English language media to translate both terms, resulting in the frequent appearance of that English word in media reporting about China, far more frequently than the use of the word in other contexts.

In Mainland China, wǎngmín and wǎngyǒu have similar meanings and both describe internet users in general. In addition, wǎngyǒu can be used by internet users to refer to each other, or more specifically friends made on the internet. In Hong Kong and Macau, wǎngmín refers to internet users while wǎngyǒu is used for internet-based friends; wǎngyǒu is much more prevalent in Taiwan, whereas wǎngmín is rarely used.

In a well-known Taiwanese bulletin board system, PTT, users refer to each other as xiāngmín (simplified Chinese: 乡民; traditional Chinese: 鄉民; lit. 'country folks') in reference to a line from the movie Hail the Judge (Chinese: 九品芝麻官; lit. 'Ninth Ranked Official'), and the term has gained widespread usage in other internet forums.

== Netizen Prize ==
The international nonprofit organisation Reporters Without Borders awards an annual Netizen Prize in recognition to an internet user, blogger, cyber-dissident, or group who has helped to promote freedom of expression on the internet.

== See also ==
- Digital citizen – citizens (of the physical space) using the Internet as a tool in order to engage in society, politics, and government participation
- Digital native – a person who has grown up in the information age
- Netiquette – social conventions for online communities
- Cyberspace – the new societal territory that is inhabited by Netizens
- Information Age
- Internet age
- Internet culture
- Internet § Users
- Network society
- Active citizenship – the concept that citizens have certain roles and responsibilities to society and the environment and should actively participate
- Social Age
- List of Internet pioneers – those who helped erect the theoretical and technological foundation of the Internet (instead of improving its content, utility or political aspects)
- Participatory culture – a culture in which the public does not act merely as consumers and voters, but also as contributors, producers and active participants
