= Michael Hauben =

American Internet theorist and author (1973–2001)

- Hauben in 2000
- Born: Michael Frederick Hauben; May 1, 1973; Boston, Massachusetts, U.S.
- Died: June 27, 2001 (aged 28); New York City, U.S.
- Occupation: Author
- Known for: Coining the term netizen

Michael Frederick Hauben (May 1, 1973 – June 27, 2001) was an American Internet theorist and author. He pioneered the study of the social impact of the Internet. Based on his interactive online research, in 1993 he coined the term and developed the concept of the netizen to describe an Internet user who actively contributes towards the development of the Net and acts as a citizen of the Net and of the world. Along with Ronda Hauben, he co-authored the 1997 book Netizens: On the History and Impact of Usenet and the Internet. Hauben's work is widely referenced in many scholarly articles and publications about the social impact of the Internet.

== Early life ==
Hauben was born on May 1, 1973, in Boston, Massachusetts, son of Jay and Ronda Hauben. He was an active participant in the Bulletin Board System (BBS) communities in the Detroit/Ann Arbor area in Michigan where his family had moved.

== Work and scholarship ==
Hauben participated in the founding meetings of the Amateur Computerist in 1987. From 1991 to 1997 he attended Columbia University in NYC, earning a BA in Computer Science (Columbia College 1995) and an MA in Communication (Teachers College 1997). During his studies at CU, Hauben did much of his original research and writing. He was all that time an active employee of the CU Academic Information Systems (AcIS), serving for one year as a Postmaster and Consultant for Electronic Mail.

Hauben was co-author of the book Netizens: On the History and Impact of Usenet and the Internet, a draft of which was put online in 1994. Print editions in English (IEEE Computer Society Press) and Japanese (Chuokoron-Sha, Inc) were published in 1997. Based on his interactive online research, Hauben coined the term 'Netizen' and introduced it into popular use. In the Preface to Netizens, Hauben wrote:

My initial research concerned the origins and development of the global discussion forum Usenet....I wanted to explore the larger Net and what it was and its significance. This is when my research uncovered the remaining details that helped me to recognize the emergence of Netizens. There are people online who actively contribute towards the development of the Net. These people understand the value of collective work and the communal aspects of public communications. These are the people who discuss and debate topics in a constructive manner, who e-mail answers to people and provide help to new-comers, who maintain FAQ files and other public information repositories, who maintain mailing lists, and so on. These are people who discuss the nature and role of this new communications medium. These are the people who as citizens of the Net I realized were Netizens." Hauben observed that, "The word citizen suggests a geographic or national definition of social membership. The word Netizen reflects the new non-geographically based social membership. So I contracted the phrase net.citizen to Netizen.

His 1993 article "Common Sense: The Impact the Net Has on People's Lives" was an analysis of responses Hauben received to questions he posted on newsgroups and mailing lists. The article begins,

Welcome to the 21st Century. You are a Netizen (a Net Citizen), and you exist as a citizen of the world thanks to the global connectivity that the Net makes possible. You consider everyone as your compatriot. You physically live in one country but you are in contact with much of the world via the global computer network. Virtually, you live next door to every other single Netizen in the world. Geographical separation is replaced by existence in the same virtual space.

This article became Chapter One of Netizens.

While still an undergraduate, Hauben began to develop a theoretical framework for his vision of the social impact of the net and the netizens. In his article "The Expanding Commonwealth of Learning: Printing and the Net," he applied his study of the Printing Revolution especially the work of Elizabeth Eisenstein to an analysis of the trajectory in which the Internet and netizens are taking society. He wrote, "Comparing the emergence of the printing press to the emergence of the global computer network will reveal some of the fascinating parallels which demonstrate how the Net is continuing the important social revolution that the printing press had begun." Quoting Hauben's work, one author wrote, "On the extraordinary explosion of knowledge with the Gutenberg printing press, see Eisenstein, The Printing Revolution in Early Modern Europe. On the intellectual foundation of the Internet actually being based on the Gutenberg printing press, see Hauben, The Expanding Commonwealth of Learning: Printing and the Net."

Using a similar method of analysis, Hauben found insights about the Internet in the understandings of the 19th Century Scottish philosopher James Mill about the importance of "liberty of the press". He argued that the net was making it possible for citizens as netizens to be the watchdogs over governments which Mill argued was the function of liberty of the press. In a footnote to his article "The Computer as a Democratizer," referring to Usenet, Hauben wrote that "the discussions are very active and provide a source of information that makes it possible to meet James Mill's criteria for both more oversight over government and a more informed population. In a sense, what was once impossible, is now possible."

Hauben was invited to Japan in 1995 by Shumpei Kumon, sociology professor and director of GLOCOM (the Japanese Center for Global Communication). In Japan, Hauben was welcomed in Tokyo at GLOCOM and then in Oita by members of COARA, the computer network community in Beppu. At the Hypernetwork '95 Beppu Bay Conference, Hauben spoke about "The Netizens and Community Networks." He was interviewed by the local Nisshi-Nippon Press. Then in Kyoto, he attended two network conferences and was an honored guest at a reception with the Mayor. Hauben was a speaker also at the GLOCOM Intelprise-Enterprise Collaboration Program (IECP). Throughout his stay in Japan, Hauben met Japanese computer and network enthusiasts to discuss the growing importance of this new medium and his vision of netizenship. Hauben also appeared in documentaries about the Internet on TV Tokyo and in write-ups in newspapers in Tokyo and Oita. Prof. Kumon included a chapter by Hauben in his 1996 book The Age of the Netizen. In 1997, the Japanese translation of Netizens: On the History and impact of Usenet and the Internet was published in a run of 5000 copies.

When he returned home from Japan, Hauben broadened his vision of the impact the Internet and the netizens would have on society. He saw in the work of the American anthropologist Margaret Mead that even in the 1960s a global culture was emerging. Using the writings of Mead, he countered the critics who claimed that the Internet's mass culture was snuffing out cultural differences. He saw instead that "more and more people of various cultures are understanding the power of the new communication technologies. More and more people are reacting against the mass media and corporate dominance and calling for a chance to express their views and contribute their culture into the global culture." Hauben presented his analysis of Internet culture at the 1997 IFIP WG 9.2/9.5 conference in Corfu, Greece.

Hauben also explored the question whether participatory democracy and netizenship are related. He studied the Port Huron Statement created in 1962 by the Students for a Democratic Society (SDS) and other sources to see what lessons he could learn about the 1960s that would help to understand the importance of the Internet and the emergence of the netizens. He opened his analysis with the observation that "the 1960s was a time of people around the world struggling for more of a say in the decisions of their society. . . People rose up to protest the ways of society which were out of their control. . . ." Hauben's conclusion was that "the development of the Internet and emergence of the netizens is an investment in a strong force towards making direct democracy a reality. The new technologies present the chance to overcome the obstacles preventing the implementation of direct democracy. Online communication forums also make possible the discussion necessary to identify today's fundamental questions."

Hauben was an avid music fan. He was a DJ of ambient techno music on WBAR, the Barnard College student radio station. With Min-Yen Kan he developed one of the original web sites for band listings, the Ever Expanding Web Music Listing! In 1996, an article in The Daily Herald (Chicago, IL) described the Ever Expanding Web Music Listing as "probably the World Wide Web's most comprehensive one-stop resource for all things musical." In the late 1990s, Hauben did online reviews of live music performances in New York City. He was concerned that the youth music scene in NYC not slip into drugs and commercial dominance. He analyzed trends in youth music culture and sent out pointers to upcoming events. He saw peer-to-peer music reviews as an alternative to commercial advertising.

== Influence of Hauben's work ==
In the second half of the 1990s, the Internet rapidly spread around the world. Online and off line, the term netizen was becoming widely used. Scholars began to refer to Hauben's research. For example, the Polish scholar and diplomat Leszek Jesien, quoting Hauben, urged the European political leaders to look at netizenship as a possible model for a new European citizenship. Boldur Barbat, a Romanian scientist, reviewed Netizens concluding it is a catalyst for the continuing of information technology and an optimistic future. Citing Hauben's work, Cameroonian sociologist Charly G Mbock saw netizenship as a necessary component of any fight against corruption and as a sign of hope for "a more equitable sharing of world resources through efficient interactions." Turkish educator Dr. E. Özlem Yiğit and Palestinian scholar Khaled Islaih also referred to Hauben as a source of their understandings of the importance of netizenship for their respective communities. Hauben's work on netizens and the Internet is known in China and has influenced how some academics and government officials analyze the impact of the Internet on society. In his study of new media and social media in the Philippines, Aj Garchitorena, as some of his theoretical foundation, cited Hauben's work especially Hauben's "Theory of the Netizen and the Democratisation of Media." Garchitorena also built on Hauben's insight that the net "brings the power of the reporter to the Netizen."

With its spread, two general uses of the term netizen developed. Hauben explained, "The first is a broad usage to refer to anyone who uses the Net, for whatever purpose.... The second usage is closer to my understanding,... people who care about Usenet and the bigger Net and work towards building the cooperative and collective nature which benefits the larger world. These are people who work towards developing the Net. … Both uses have spread from the online community, appearing in newspapers, magazines, television, books and other off-line media. As more and more people join the online community and contribute towards the nurturing of the Net and towards the development of a great shared social wealth, the ideas and values of Netizenship spread. But with the increasing commercialization and privatization of the Net, Netizenship is being challenged." He called on scholars, "to look back at the pioneering vision and actions that have helped make the Net possible and examine what lessons they provide." He argued that is what he and the Netizens book tried to do.

One contributor to the 2004 celebration of the 250th Anniversary of Columbia University in New York City, referring to Hauben's contribution wrote, "While the prevalence and universality of the Internet today may lead some to take it for granted, Michael Hauben did not. A pioneer in the study of the Internet's impact on society, Hauben helped identify the collaborative nature of the Internet and its effects on the global community."

== Legacy ==
After sustaining injuries resulting from an accident where he was hit by a taxi, Hauben died in New York City on June 27, 2001, a victim of suicide. At the time of his death, he had lost a job, accumulated a large credit card debt, and was about to lose his apartment.

The significance of Hauben's contribution to the appreciation of the emergence of the netizen is a deeper sense that the Internet is accompanied by an expansion of the fullness of human empowerment. In 2012, cultural anthropologist Shirley Fedorak summed up Hauben's contribution. She wrote. "Studies have found that greater participation in the political landscape is influenced by access to information.... Indeed, Michael Hauben identified a new form of citizenship emerging from widespread use of the Internet. Hauben coined the term netizens, and he considered them crucial for building a more democratic human society. These individuals are empowered through the Internet and use it to solve socio-political problems and to explore ways of improving the world."

== Bibliography ==
- Netizens: On the History and Impact of Usenet and the Internet published May 1997 by IEEE Computer Society Press. (ISBN 0-8186-7706-6)
- "Culture and Communication," chapter in The Ethical Global Information Society: Culture and Democracy Revisited, Jacques Berleur and Diane Whitehouse, Editors, IFIP, pp. 197–202 published 1997 by Chapman & Hall.
- "Netizens," in CMC Magazine, February 1997, http://www.december.com/cmc/mag/1997/feb/hauben.html
- "Birth of Netizens," chapter in The Age of Netizens, Shumpei Kumon, published 1996 by NTT Press, ISBN 4-87188-461-9
- "Netizens" in The Thinker Vol 2, No. 5 February 2, 1996, p. 1, Stanford University.
- "OnLine Public Discussion and the Future of Democracy," in Proceedings Telecommunities 95: Equity on the Internet, Victoria, B.C.
- Co-author, "Interview with Henry Spencer: On Usenet News and C News," chapter in Internet Secrets, edited by John R. Levine and Carol Baroudi, published 1995 by IDG Books.
- "Exploring New York City's Online Community," in CMC Magazine, May 1995. http://www.ibiblio.org/cmc/mag/1995/may/hauben.html
- "Participatory Democracy From the 1960s and SDS into the Future Online", 1995 reprinted in Amateur Computerist Vol. 11 No. 1, http://www.ais.org/~jrh/acn/ACn11-1.pdf
- "A New Democratic Medium: The Global Computer Communications Network," in HKCUS Quarterly, no. 14 July 1994, p. 26. Special Issue on Hong Kong Media Facing 1997.
