= Internet influences on communities =

A community is "a body of people or things viewed collectively". According to Steven Brintgregates of people who share common activities and/or beliefs and who are bound together principally by relations of affect, loyalty, common values, and/or personal concern – i.e., interest in the personalities and life events of one another".

Jenny Preece suggested to evaluate communities according to physical features: size, location and the boundaries that confined them. When commuting became a way of life and cheaper transportation made it easier for people to join multiple communities to satisfy different needs, the strength and type of relationships among people seemed more promising criteria.

Since social capital is built of trust, rules, norms and networks, it can be said that the social capital of communities has grown. The lower entrance barriers to the community have made it easier to be a part of many different communities. This goes hand in hand with Don Tapscott's theory of how the digital society has changed collaboration and innovation to a world of co-creation.

From birth to death, people are shaped by the communities to which they belong, affecting everything from how they talk to whom they talk with. Just like the telephone and the television changed the way people interact socially, computers have transformed communication and at the same time created new norms for social capital.

"A virtual community is a group of people who may or may not meet one another face to face, who exchange words and ideas through the mediation of computer bulletin board systems and other digital networks". Along with the fact that computer usage has spread, the use of virtual communities have grown. Rheingold defines virtual communities as "social aggregations that emerge from the Net when enough people carry on those public discussions long enough, with sufficient human feeling, to form webs of personal relationships in cyberspace". Michael Porter describes a virtual community as "an aggregation of individuals or business partners who interact around a shared interest, where the interaction is at least partially supported and/or mediated by technology and guided by some protocols or norms". Virtual communities consist of "people with shared interests or goals for whom electronic communication is a primary form of interaction" and have created new forms of collaboration. "The most skilled and experienced members of the community provide leadership and help integrate contributions from the community as a whole. This way, virtual communities can use the voluntary motivations that exist in a community to assign the right person to the right task more effectively than traditional forms".

According to Benkler, we can "see a thickening of the preexisting relations with friends and family, in particular with those who were hard to reach earlier". "Also, we are beginning to see the emergence of a greater scope for limited-purpose, loose relationships. Although these may not fit the ideal model of virtual communities, they are effective and meaningful to their participants".

The heightened individual capacity that actually is a driving social force have raised concerns by many that the Internet is further fragmenting the community, making people spend their time in front of their computer instead of socializing with each other. Empirical studies show, however, that we are using the Internet and communities at the expense of television, and that is an exchange that promotes social ties.

== Social capital ==
Social capital is a concept built from the premise that some value emanates from social networking sites due to the social interaction which may have positive influence in the society of the individuals who belong to the group by facilitating coordinated actions (Putnam et al., 1993). Simply put, social capital is “the ability of people to work together for some common purpose” (Rosenfeld, 1997). Trust, rules, norms and networks create social capital (Barr, 2000), Narayan (1997).

=== Evaluation ===
A number of innovative ways have been employed to measure social capital, however, there is not a one true way of measuring it. First, the most comprehensive definitions of social capital are multidimensional, incorporating different levels and units of analysis. Second, any attempt to measure the properties of inherently ambiguous concepts such as "community", "network" and "organization" is correspondingly problematic. Third, few long-standing surveys were designed to measure "social capital", leaving contemporary researchers to compile indexes from a range of approximate items, such as measures of trust in government, voting trends, memberships in civic organizations, hours spent volunteering. New surveys currently being tested will hopefully produce more direct and accurate indicators.

Measuring social capital may be difficult, but it is not impossible, and several excellent studies have identified useful proxies for social capital, using different types and combinations of qualitative, comparative and quantitative research methodologies .

Knack and Keefer (1997) used indicators of trust and civic norms from the World Values Survey for a sample of 29 market economies. They used these measures as proxies for the strength of civic associations in order to test two different propositions on the effects of social capital on economic growth, the "Olson effects" (associations stifle growth through rent-seeking) and "Putnam effects" (associations facilitate growth by increasing trust). Inglehart (1997) has done the most extensive work on the implications of the WVS's results for general theories of modernization and development.

Narayan and Pritchett (1997) construct a measure of social capital in rural Tanzania, using data from the Tanzania Social Capital and Poverty Survey (SCPS). This large-scale survey asked individuals about the extent and characteristics of their associational activity, and their trust in various institutions and individuals. They match this measure of social capital with data on household income in the same villages (both from the SCPS and from an earlier household survey, the Human Resources Development Survey). They find that village-level social capital raises household incomes.

Temple and Johnson (1998), extending the earlier work of Adelman and Morris (1967), use ethnic diversity, social mobility, and the prevalence of telephone services in several sub-Saharan African countries as proxies for the density of social networks. They combine several related items into an index of "social capability", and show that this can explain significant amounts of variation in national economic growth rates.

Measuring social capital may be difficult, but it is not impossible, and several excellent studies have identified useful proxies for social capital, using different types and combinations of qualitative, comparative and quantitative research methodologies (Woolcock and Narayan, 2000).

How we measure social capital depends on how we define it. The most comprehensive definitions of social capital are multidimensional, incorporating different levels and units of analysis. Trust, civic engagement, and community involvement are generally seen as ways to measure social capital. Depending on the definition of social capital and the context, some indicators may be more appropriate than others. Once it has been decided which how social capital is to be measured, for example by measuring civic engagement through household surveys, cultural factors may be taken into account in designing the survey instrument. Newspaper readership may be a better indicator of civic engagement in Italy (Putnam, 1993) than in India because of the varying literacy rates.

Measuring social capital among the poor, particularly studying the same households over time, is difficult because the poor are often involved in informal work, may not have a long-term address or may move.

Robert D. Putnam (2000) suggested a social capital concepts of bonding and bridging. Bonding is viewed as relations among members of the same community. Bridging is viewed as relationships between members among different communities.

=== Influences on communities ===
Business 'cluster' is “used to represent concentrations of firms that are able to produce synergy because of their geographic proximity and interdependence” (Rosenfeld, 1997). Steinfield, C. et al. (2010) found, that “the amount of perceived social capital significantly predicted market exposure” of company performance in a knowledge-intensive business cluster. Social capital strengthens regional production networks.

The rate of networking (defined as various forms of strategic alliances and joint ventures) generally reflects the levels of social capital and trust that exists (Rosenfeld, 1997). Robert Putnam (1993) found that stock of social capital predicts economic performance. There is some evidence suggesting that social relationships play an important role in the survival of small businesses (Granovetter, 1984), yet the relative contribution of other factors, such as managerial skills and environmental context are unknown.

At the institutional level, disciplinary climate and academic norms established by the school community and the mutual trust between home and school are major forms of social capital. These forms of social capital are found to contribute to student learning outcomes in East Asian countries such as Singapore, Korea, and Hong Kong. They have been shown to have a significant impact, not only on creating a learning and caring school climate, but also on improving the quality of schooling and reducing inequality of learning outcomes between social-class groups.

Information and communication technologies (ICT) affect various aspects of communities, including communications, social capital, friendships and trust. Internet has the most influence on communities due to its interactive nature and wide usage. According to Katz, Rice, Aspden (2001) “Internet has unique, even transformational qualities as a communication channel, including relative anonymity and the ability to easily link with others who have similar interests, values, and beliefs”.

Internet, and computer-mediated communication supports and accelerates ways how people operate at the centers of partial, personal communities, and switching rapidly and frequently between different groups (Wellman, 1996). Internet usage is associated with positive and negative aspects for communities.

For example, Bargh and McKenna (2004) claim that “Internet use does not appear to weaken the fabric of neighborhoods and communities”. Galston (1999) claims, that Internet is “capable of promoting a kind of socialization and moral learning through mutual adjustment”.

Kavanaugh and Patterson (2001) did not find that increased Internet usage increased community involvement and attachment. According to Gilleard, C. et al. (2007), “ownership and use of domestic information and communication technology reduces the sense of attachment to the local neighborhood among individuals 50 and older in England.” But they continue that “domestic information and communication technology may be more liberating of neighborhood boundedness than destructive of social capital.”

Anonymity is often mentioned in popular media as a possible cause for negative effects. But according to Bargh and McKenna (2004), anonymity also associated with positive effects: “research has found that the relative anonymity aspect encourages self-expression, and the relative absence of physical and nonverbal interaction cues (e.g., attractiveness) facilitates the formation of relationships on other, deeper bases such as shared values and beliefs.”

Pigg and Crank (2004) suggest how Internet can facilitate interaction within members of community. They suggest a concept of “reciprocity transaction”, that implies that “one person provides something of value to another in expectation that, at some point in time, the other person will act similarly”. It is suggested that ICT supports reciprocity transaction by providing social support or valuable information not available to public, and share meaning. Shared presence combined with depth of information provides shared meaning (Miranda and Saunders, 2003).

Internet usage is generally not associated with decline in social contact. For example, Katz, Rice, Aspden (2001) found that Internet users were more likely to communicate with others through other media (especially telephone) more than do nonusers, and Internet use was associated with greater levels of social interaction (although this was more widely dispersed). Thy claim, that “Internet use does not appear to weaken the fabric of neighborhoods and communities.” Ellison, Steinfield and Lampe (2007) claim that online interactions do not necessarily remove people from their offline world, but support relationships, especially when life changes move them away from each other. They say, that Internet “seems well-suited to social software applications because it enables users to maintain such ties cheaply and easily”.

Internet-based communications is usually cheaper than phone, fax and letter-based communications, and are regarded as cheap to keep up with family and friends abroad (Foley, 2004), to keep up with business friends (e.g. Molony, 2009).

Galston (1999) suggested an approach to analyze virtual communities based on entry and exist costs: “when barriers to leaving old groups and joining new ones are relatively low, exit will tend to be the preferred option; as these costs rise, the exercise of voice becomes more likely.” He suggested, that “exit [from community] will be the predominant response to dissatisfaction”. Also, “virtual communities do not promote the development of voice; because they emphasize personal choice, they do not acknowledge the need for authority”, and do not foster mutual obligation.

=== Influences on family, friends and neighbors ===
Positive Internet usage on relationships between family members and friends were found. For example, Bargh and McKenna (2004) wrote that “Internet, mainly through e-mail, has facilitated communication and thus close ties between family and friends, especially those too far away to visit in person on a regular basis”.

ICT helps to create friendships. “When Internet-formed relationships get close enough (i.e., when sufficient trust has been established), people tend to bring them into their “real world”—that is, the traditional face-to-face and telephone interaction sphere” (Bargh, McKenna, 2004.) “Internet facilitates new connections, in that it provides people with an alternative way to connect with others who share their interests or relational goals” (Ellison, Heino, & Gibbs, 2006).

Cummings, Lee and Kraut (2006) found that students who move off to college “communicating with these friends prevents the relationships from declining as swiftly as they otherwise would. Communication seems to inject energy into a relationship and prevents it from going dormant.” Email and instant messaging are found to be especially useful.

Hampton and Wellman (2001) found that, in a wired community, many neighbors got to know each other better through the use of a local computer network. But according to Katz (2001), “use of the Internet per se is not associated with different levels of awareness of one's neighbors”.

=== Influences on social network ===
Social networks play increasingly larger role for Internet users. According to Castells (1999), “social networks substitute for communities, with locally based communities being one of the many possible alternatives for the creation and maintenance of social networks, and the Internet providing another such alternative.”

Social networks provide possibilities to create new relationships, and to maintain existing ones. According to Lampe, Ellison, Steinfield (2007), users of a popular social network Facebook mainly use the network to learn more about people they meet offline, and are less inclined to initiate new connections: “Facebook members seem to be using Facebook as a surveillance tool for maintaining previous relationships, and as a “social search” tool by which they investigate people they've met offline”.

Connections formed online sometimes are transformed to off-line personal relationships. Parks and Floyd (1996) report that 60% of their random sample “reported that they had formed a personal relationship of some kind with someone they had first contacted through a newsgroup”, and that “relationships that begin on line rarely stay there”.

Privacy issues are commonly reported in popular media. According to Gross and Acquisti (2005), “many individuals in a person's online extended network would hardly be defined as actual friends by that person; in fact many may be complete strangers. And yet, personal and often sensitive information is freely and publicly provided.” Therefore, users potentially expose themselves to physical and cyber risks.

=== Influences on social capital ===
Internet usage can cause multiple effects for social capital, and its effects are not yet clear. For example, Pigg & Crank (2004) suggest that studies of relationship between online networks and social capital is still too much in their infancy to reach any useful conclusions. Although it is generally thought that Internet affects social capital, “mechanisms are unclear” (Hampton, Wellman, 1999).

Internet usage can both increase and decrease social capital: “people engage in social and asocial activities when online” (Hampton, Wellman, 1999).

For example, Nie (2001) claims that social capital can be decreased: “Internet use may actually reduce interpersonal interaction and communication”. He also claims, that “Internet users do not become more sociable; rather, they already display a higher degree of social connectivity and participation”. Hampton, Wellman (1999) claims, that “increased connectivity and involvement not only can expose people to more contact and more information, it can reduce commitment to community”, because “immersiveness can turn people away from community”.

Some researchers claim that social capital can be increased by Internet usage. For example, Ellison, Heino, & Gibbs (2006) claim that “Internet facilitates new connections, in that it provides people with an alternative way to connect with others who share their interests or relational goals”. Hampton, Wellman (1999) state that Internet supplements network capital “by extending existing levels of face-to-face and telephone contact.”

Reduction of communication costs increase the frequency and duration of communication, and increase social capital's bonding and bridging.

The Net is particularly suited to the development of multiple weak ties (Castells, 1999), thus expanding sociability beyond the socially defined boundaries of self-recognition. Internet supports weak ties between individuals, which can the foundation for bridging social capital (Ellison, Steinfieldm, Lampe, 2007). Resnick (2001) suggests that with the help of new technologies (e.g. distribution lists, photo directories, search) new forms of social capital occurs in online social network sites. Ellison, Steinfield and Lampe (2007) suggest that intensity of Facebook use is positively associated with individuals’ perceived bridging social capital: for undergraduate students, there is a “strong association between use of Facebook and the three types of social capital, with the strongest relationship being to bridging social capital.

According to Williams (2006), because of the low costs of communication, there might be more of the bridging function online than offline. "The social capital created by these networks generates broader identities and generalized reciprocity". Williams (2006) suggested Internet Social Capital Scales (ICST) to measure social capital bridging and bonding. Ellison, Steinfield and Lampe (2007) assessed social capital bonding by using ICST, and found, that “Facebook is indeed implicated in students’ efforts to develop and maintain bridging social capital at college, although we cannot assess causal direction.”

Intensity of Facebook use was positively associated with individuals’ perceived bonding social capital (Ellison, Steinfield and Lampe, 2007). But they also found, that bonding social capital was also predicted by high self-esteem, satisfaction with university life, as with use of Facebook. Therefore, high self-esteem, and satisfaction with university life are likely causes of perceived bonding social capital, and heavier Facebook use.

Friends use the Internet to maintain ties. “Internet is particularly useful for keeping contact among friends who are socially and geographically dispersed. ... Distance still matters: communication is lower with distant than nearby friends” (Hampton, Wellman, 1999).

== See also ==
- Online community
- Tribe (internet)
- Online participation
- Social web
