= Online community =

Virtual community that exists online

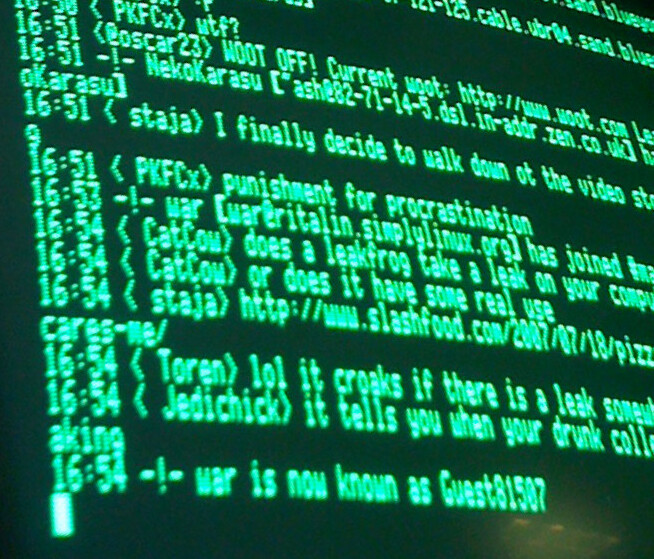
IRC users interacting socially, in 2007

An online community, also called an internet community or web community, is a community whose members engage in computer-mediated communication primarily via the Internet. Members of the community usually share common interests. For many, online communities may feel like home, consisting of a "family of invisible friends".

An online community can act as an information system where members can post, comment on discussions, give advice or collaborate. Commonly, people communicate through social networking sites, chat rooms, forums, email lists, discussion boards and social media platforms. These include Facebook, Twitter, Instagram, Discord, Reddit, and dedicated professional communities like LinkedIn, among others. People can also join online communities through video games, blogs, and virtual worlds.

The rise in popularity of Web 2.0 websites has allowed for easier real-time communication and connection to others and facilitated the introduction of new ways for information to be exchanged. However, these interactions may also lead to a downfall of social interactions or deposit more negative and derogatory forms of speaking to others; in connection, surfaced forms of racism, bullying, sexist comments, and similar negative interactions may also be investigated and linked to online communities.

One scholarly definition of an online community is this: "a virtual community is defined as an aggregation of individuals or business partners who interact around a shared interest, where the interaction is partially supported or mediated by technology (or both) and guided by some protocols or norms".

== Community aspect ==
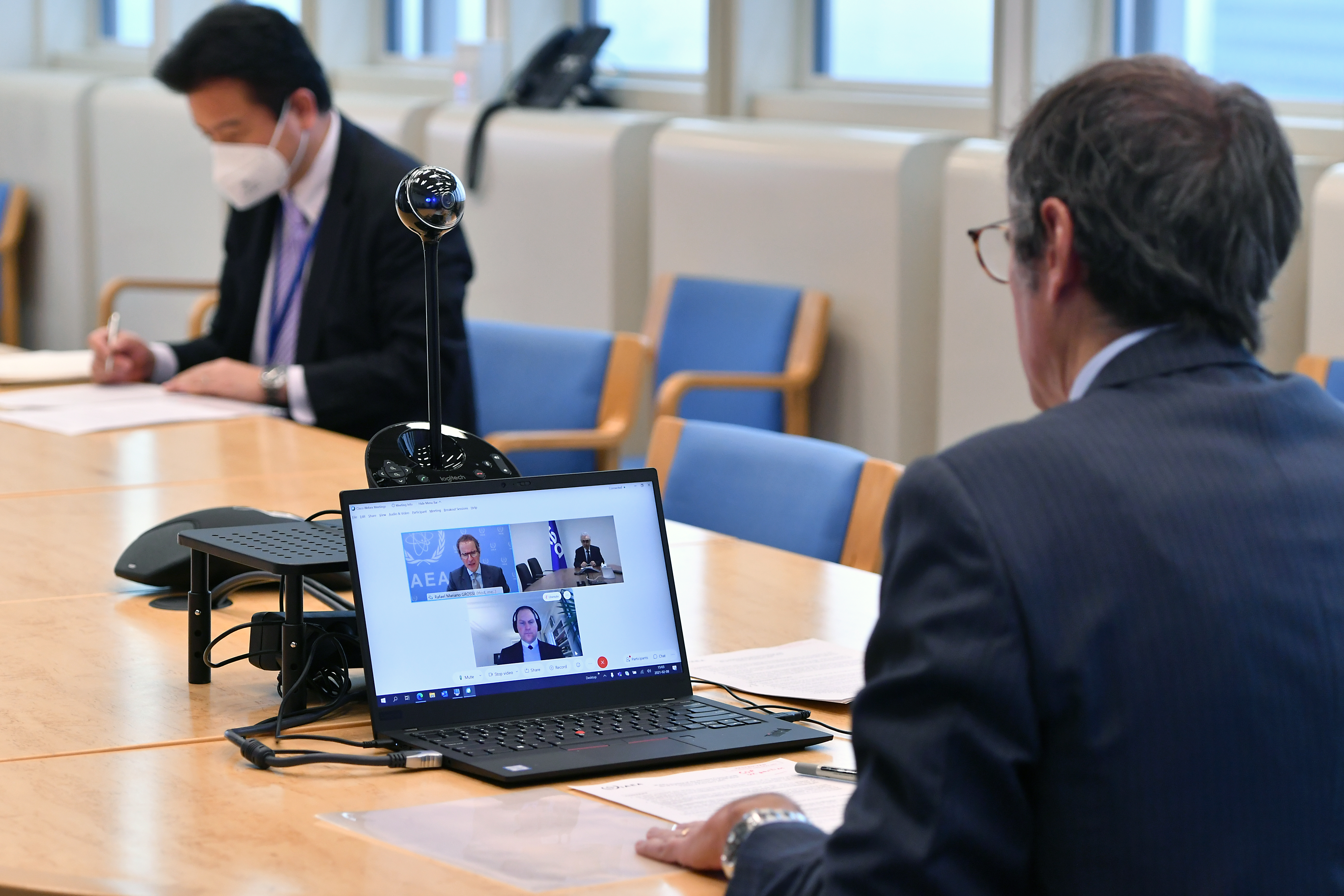
Exchange of information and support in a virtual space

The traditional definition of a community is of geographically circumscribed entity, such as a neighbourhood or village. Virtual communities are usually dispersed geographically, and thus do not satisfy the traditional definition. Some online communities are linked geographically. A different definition of a community is a group of people that has a boundary between members and non-members. By this definition, an online or virtual community is a community. Online communities resemble offline communities in the sense that both types provide support, information, friendship and acceptance between strangers. While in a virtual community space, users may be expected to feel a sense of belonging and a mutual attachment among the members that are in the space.

One of the most influential part about virtual communities is the opportunity to communicate through several different websites or other online networks. Virtual communities provide alternative methods of communication to older technology including postal services, fax machines, and speaking on the telephone. Early research into the existence of online communities was concerned with social ontology: the nature of virtual reality and to what degree the groups of people communicating online should be categorised or considered to exist. In the seventeenth century, scholars associated with the Royal Society of London formed a community through the exchange of letters. "Community without propinquity", coined by urban planner Melvin Webber in 1963 and "community liberated", analyzed by Barry Wellman in 1979 began the modern era of thinking about non-local community. As well, Benedict Anderson's Imagined Communities in 1983, described how different technologies, such as national newspapers, contributed to the development of national and regional consciousness among early nation-states. Some authors that built their theories on Anderson's imagined communities have been critical of the concept, claiming that all communities are based on communication and that virtual/real dichotomy is disintegrating, making use of the word "virtual" problematic or even obsolete.

== Purpose ==
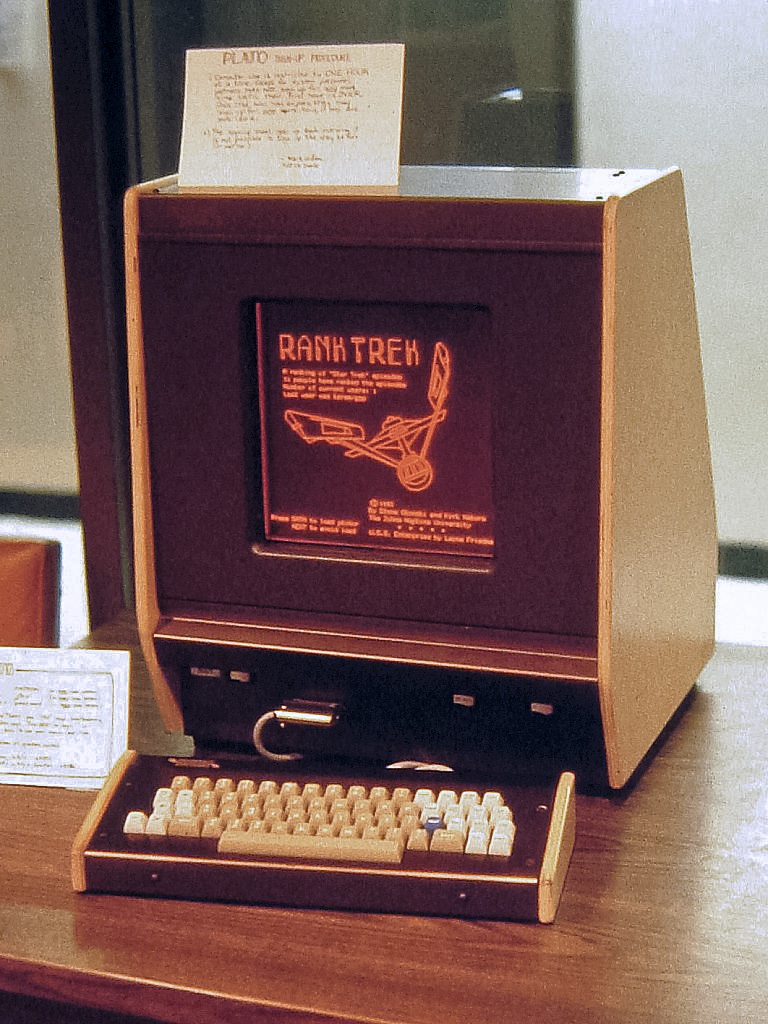
A PLATO V terminal in 1981 displaying RankTrek application

Virtual communities are used for a variety of social and professional groups; interaction between community members vary from personal to purely formal. Communication tools like email lists can serve both personal and professional functions within virtual communities.

Digital communities (web communities but also communities that are formed over, e.g., Xbox and PlayStation) provide a platform for a range of services to users. It has been argued that they can fulfill Maslow's hierarchy of needs. They allow for social interaction across the world between people of different cultures who might not otherwise have met, with offline meetings also becoming more common. Another key use of web communities is access to and the exchange of information. With communities for even very small niches, it is possible to find people also interested in a topic and to seek and share information on a subject where there are no such people available in the immediate area offline. This has led to a range of popular sites based on areas such as health, employment, finances and education. Online communities can be vital for companies for marketing and outreach.

Unexpected and innovative uses of web communities have also emerged with social networks being used in conflicts to alert citizens of impending attacks. The UN sees the web and specifically social networks as an important tool in conflicts and emergencies.

Web communities have grown in popularity; as of October 2014, 6 of the 20 most-trafficked websites were community-based sites. The amount of traffic to such websites is expected to increase as a growing proportion of the world's population attains Internet access.

Internet communities offer the advantage of instant information exchange that is not possible in a real-life community. This interaction allows people to engage in many activities from their home, such as: shopping, paying bills, and searching for specific information. Users of online communities also have access to thousands of specific discussion groups where they can form specialized relationships and access information in such categories as: politics, technical assistance, social activities, health (see above) and recreation. Virtual communities provide an ideal medium for these types of relationships, as information can easily be posted and response times can be very fast. Another benefit is that these types of communities can give users a feeling of membership and belonging. Users can give and receive support, and it is simple and cheap to use.

== Categorization ==
The idea of a community is not a new concept. On the telephone, in ham radio and in the online world, social interactions no longer have to be based on proximity; instead they can literally be with anyone anywhere. The study of communities has had to adapt along with the new technologies. Many researchers have used ethnography to attempt to understand what people do in online spaces, how they express themselves, what motivates them, how they govern themselves, what attracts them, and why some people prefer to observe rather than participate. Online communities can congregate around a shared interest and can be spread across multiple websites.

Some features of online communities include:

- Content: articles, information, and news about a topic of interest to a group of people.
- Forums or newsgroups and email: so that community members can communicate in delayed fashion.
- Chat and instant messaging: so that community members can communicate more immediately.

=== Development ===
Online communities typically establish a set of values, sometimes known collectively as netiquette or Internet etiquette, as they grow. These values may include: opportunity, education, culture, democracy, human services, equality within the economy, information, sustainability, and communication. An online community's purpose is to serve as a common ground for people who share the same interests.

Online communities may be used as calendars to keep up with events such as upcoming gatherings or sporting events. They also form around activities and hobbies. Many online communities relating to health care help inform, advise, and support patients and their families. Students can take classes online and they may communicate with their professors and peers online. Businesses have also started using online communities to communicate with their customers about their products and services as well as to share information about the business. Other online communities allow a wide variety of professionals to come together to share thoughts, ideas and theories.

Fandom is an example of what online communities can evolve into. Online communities have grown in influence in "shaping the phenomena around which they organize" according to Nancy K. Baym's work. She says that: "More than any other commercial sector, the popular culture industry relies on online communities to publicize and provide testimonials for their products." The strength of the online community's power is displayed through the season 3 premiere of BBC's Sherlock. Online activity by fans seem to have had a noticeable influence on the plot and direction of the season opening episode. Mark Lawson of The Guardian recounts how fans have, to a degree, directed the outcome of the events of the episode. He says that "Sherlock has always been one of the most web-aware shows, among the first to find a satisfying way of representing electronic chatter on-screen." Fan communities in platforms like Twitter, Instagram, and Reddit around sports, actors, and musicians have become powerful communities both culturally and politically. The My Little Pony: Friendship Is Magic fandom notably has adopted its own numerous online platforms and communities, partly owing to its roots from 4chan, where adult fans of the show (commonly known as bronies) were banned from posting Friendship Is Magic-related content from 2011 to 2012. Some show staff, including show creator Lauren Faust and screenwriter M.A. Larson, have hosted Q&A sessions on forums like /mlp/.

Discussions where members may post their feedback are essential in the development of an online community. Online communities may encourage individuals to come together to teach and learn from one another. They may encourage learners to discuss and learn about real-world problems and situations, as well as to focus on such things as teamwork, collaborative thinking and personal experiences.

=== Blogs ===
Blogs are among the major platforms on which online communities form. Blogging practices include microblogging, where the amount of information in a single element is smaller, and liveblogging, in which an ongoing event is blogged about in real time.

The ease and convenience of blogging has allowed for its growth. Major blogging platforms include Twitter and Tumblr, which combine social media and blogging, as well as platforms such as WordPress, which allow content to be hosted on their own servers but also permit users to download, install, and modify the software on their own servers. As of October 2014, 23.1% of the top 10 million websites are either hosted on or run WordPress.

=== Forums ===
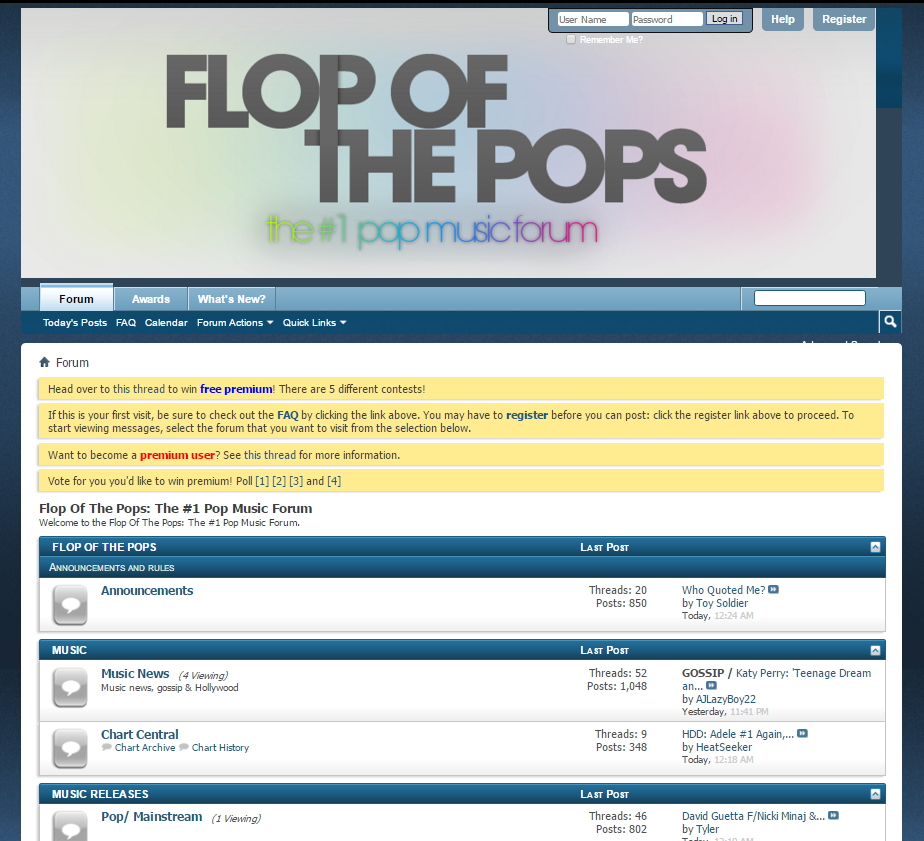
A screenshot of a music discussion forum

Internet forums, sometimes called bulletin boards, are websites which allow users to post topics also known as threads for discussion with other users able to reply creating a conversation. Forums follow a hierarchical structure of categories, with many popular forum software platforms categorising forums depending on their purpose, and allowing forum administrators to create subforums within their platform. With time more advanced features have been added into forums; the ability to attach files, embed YouTube videos, and send private messages is now commonplace. As of October 2014, the largest forum Gaia Online contained over 2 billion posts.

Members are commonly assigned into user groups which control their access rights and permissions. Common access levels include the following:

- User: A standard account with the ability to create topics and reply.
- Moderator: Moderators are typically tasked with the daily administration tasks such as answering user queries, dealing with rule-breaking posts, and the moving, editing or deletion of topics or posts.
- Administrator: Administrators deal with the forum strategy including the implementation of new features alongside more technical tasks such as server maintenance.

=== Social networks ===
Social networks are platforms allowing users to set up their own profile and build connections with like minded people who pursue similar interests through interaction. The first traceable example of such a site is SixDegrees.com, set up in 1997, which included a friends list and the ability to send messages to members linked to friends and see other users associations. For much of the 21st century, the popularity of such networks has been growing. Friendster was the first social network to gain mass media attention; however, by 2004 it had been overtaken in popularity by Myspace, which in turn was later overtaken by Facebook. In 2013, Facebook attracted 1.23 billion monthly users, rising from 145 million in 2008. Facebook was the first social network to surpass 1 billion registered accounts, and by 2020, had more than 2.7 billion active users. Meta Platforms, the owner of Facebook, also owns three other leading platforms for online communities: Instagram, WhatsApp, and Facebook Messenger.

Most top-ranked social networks originate in the United States, but European services like VK, Japanese platform LINE, or Chinese social networks WeChat, QQ or video-sharing app Douyin (internationally known as TikTok) have also garnered appeal in their respective regions.

Current trends focus around the increased use of mobile devices when using social networks. Statistics from Statista show that, in 2013, 97.9 million users accessed social networks from a mobile device in the United States.

== Classification ==
Researchers and organizations have worked to classify types of online community and to characterise their structure. For example, it is important to know the security, access, and technology requirements of a given type of community as it may evolve from an open to a private and regulated forum. It has been argued that the technical aspects of online communities, such as whether pages can be created and edited by the general user base (as is the case with wikis) or only certain users (as is the case with most blogs), can place online communities into stylistic categories. Another approach argues that "online community" is a metaphor and that contributors actively negotiate the meaning of the term, including values and social norms.

Some research has looked at the users of online communities. Amy Jo Kim has classified the rituals and stages of online community interaction and called it the "membership life cycle". Clay Shirky talks about communities of practice, whose members collaborate and help each other in order to make something better or improve a certain skill. What makes these communities bond is "love" of something, as demonstrated by members who go out of their way to help without any financial interest. Campbell et al. developed a character theory for analyzing online communities, based on tribal typologies. In the communities they investigated they identified three character types:

1. The Big Man (offer a form of order and stability to the community by absorbing many conflictual situations personally)
2. The Sorcerer (will not engage in reciprocity with others in the community)
3. The Trickster (generally a comical yet complex figure that is found in most of the world's culture)

Online communities have also forced retail firms to change their business strategies. Companies have to network more, adjust computations, and alter their organizational structures. This leads to changes in a company's communications with their manufacturers including the information shared and made accessible for further productivity and profits. Because consumers and customers in all fields are becoming accustomed to more interaction and engagement online, adjustments must be considered made in order to keep audiences intrigued.

Online communities have been characterized as "virtual settlements" that have the following four requirements: interactivity, a variety of communicators, a common public place where members can meet and interact, and sustained membership over time. Based on these considerations, it can be said that microblogs such as Twitter can be classified as online communities.

=== Internet-based ===
The explosive diffusion of the Internet since the mid-1990s fostered the proliferation of virtual communities in the form of social networking services and online communities. Virtual communities may synthesize Web 2.0 technologies with the community, and therefore have been described as Community 2.0, although strong community bonds have been forged online since the early 1970s on timeshare systems like PLATO and later on Usenet. Online communities depend upon social interaction and exchange between users online. This interaction emphasizes the reciprocity element of the unwritten social contract between community members.

=== Internet message boards ===
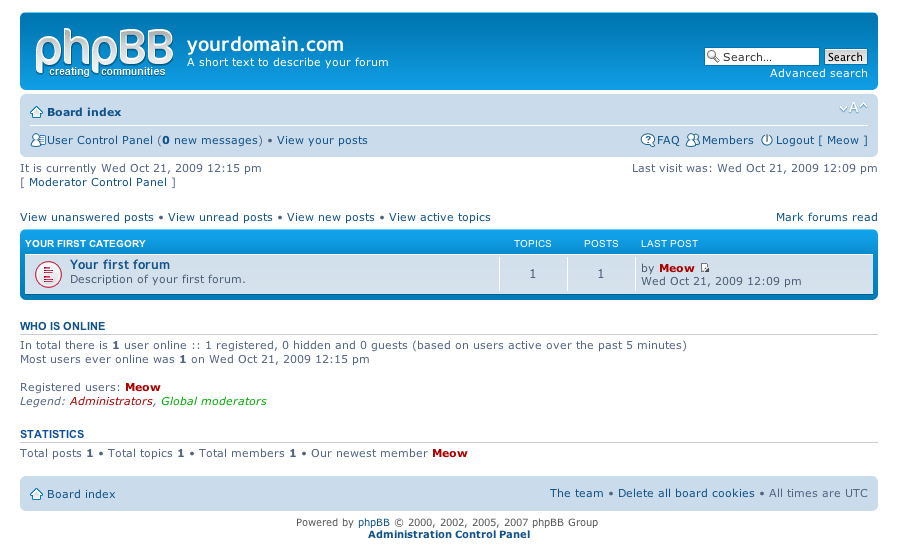
An Internet forum powered by phpBB

An online message board is a forum where people can discuss thoughts or ideas on various topics or simply express an idea. Users may choose which thread, or board of discussion, they would like to read or contribute to. A user will start a discussion by making a post. Other users who choose to respond can follow the discussion by adding their own posts to that thread at any time. Unlike in spoken conversations, message boards do not usually have instantaneous responses; users actively go to the website to check for responses.

Anyone can register to participate in an online message board. People can choose to participate in the virtual community, even if or when they choose not to contribute their thoughts and ideas. Unlike chat rooms, at least in practice, message boards can accommodate an almost infinite number of users.

Internet users' urges to talk to and reach out to strangers online is unlike those in real-life encounters where people are hesitant and often unwilling to step in to help strangers. Studies have shown that people are more likely to intervene when they are the only one in a situation. With Internet message boards, users at their computers are alone, which might contribute to their willingness to reach out. Another possible explanation is that people can withdraw from a situation much more easily online than off. They can simply click exit or log off, whereas they would have to find a physical exit and deal with the repercussions of trying to leave a situation in real life. The lack of status that is presented with an online identity also might encourage people, because, if one chooses to keep it private, there is no associated label of gender, age, ethnicity or lifestyle.

=== Online chat rooms ===
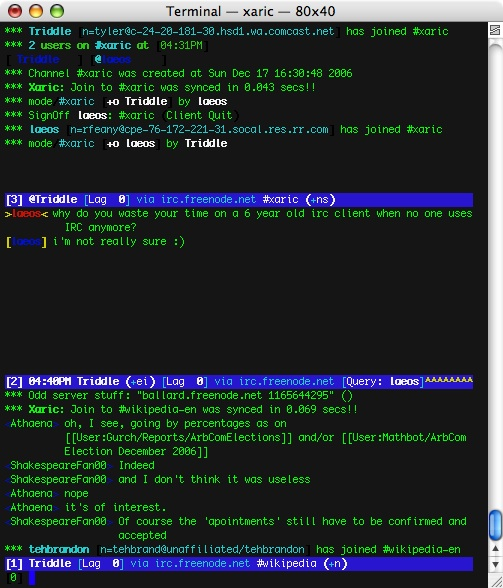
An example of an IRC chat session on Xaric, a text-based client. Shown are two IRC channels and a private conversation.

Shortly after the rise of interest in message boards and forums, people started to want a way of communicating with their "communities" in real time. The downside to message boards was that people would have to wait until another user replied to their posting, which, with people all around the world in different time frames, could take a while. The development of online chat rooms allowed people to talk to whoever was online at the same time they were. This way, messages were sent and online users could immediately respond.

The original development by CompuServe CB hosted forty channels in which users could talk to one another in real time. The idea of forty different channels led to the idea of chat rooms that were specific to different topics. Users could choose to join an already existent chat room they found interesting, or start a new "room" if they found nothing to their liking. Real-time chatting was also brought into virtual games, where people could play against one another and also talk to one another through text. Now, chat rooms can be found on all sorts of topics, so that people can talk with others who share similar interests. Chat rooms are now provided by Internet Relay Chat (IRC) and other individual websites such as Yahoo, MSN, and AOL.

Chat room users communicate through text-based messaging. Most chat room providers are similar and include an input box, a message window, and a participant list. The input box is where users can type their text-based message to be sent to the providing server. The server will then transmit the message to the computers of anyone in the chat room so that it can be displayed in the message window. The message window allows the conversation to be tracked and usually places a time stamp once the message is posted. There is usually a list of the users who are currently in the room, so that people can see who is in their virtual community.

Users can communicate as if they are speaking to one another in real life. This "simulated reality" attribute makes it easy for users to form a virtual community, because chat rooms allow users to get to know one another as if they were meeting in real life. The individual "room" feature also makes it more likely that the people within a chat room share a similar interest; an interest that allows them to bond with one another and be willing to form a friendship.

=== Virtual worlds ===
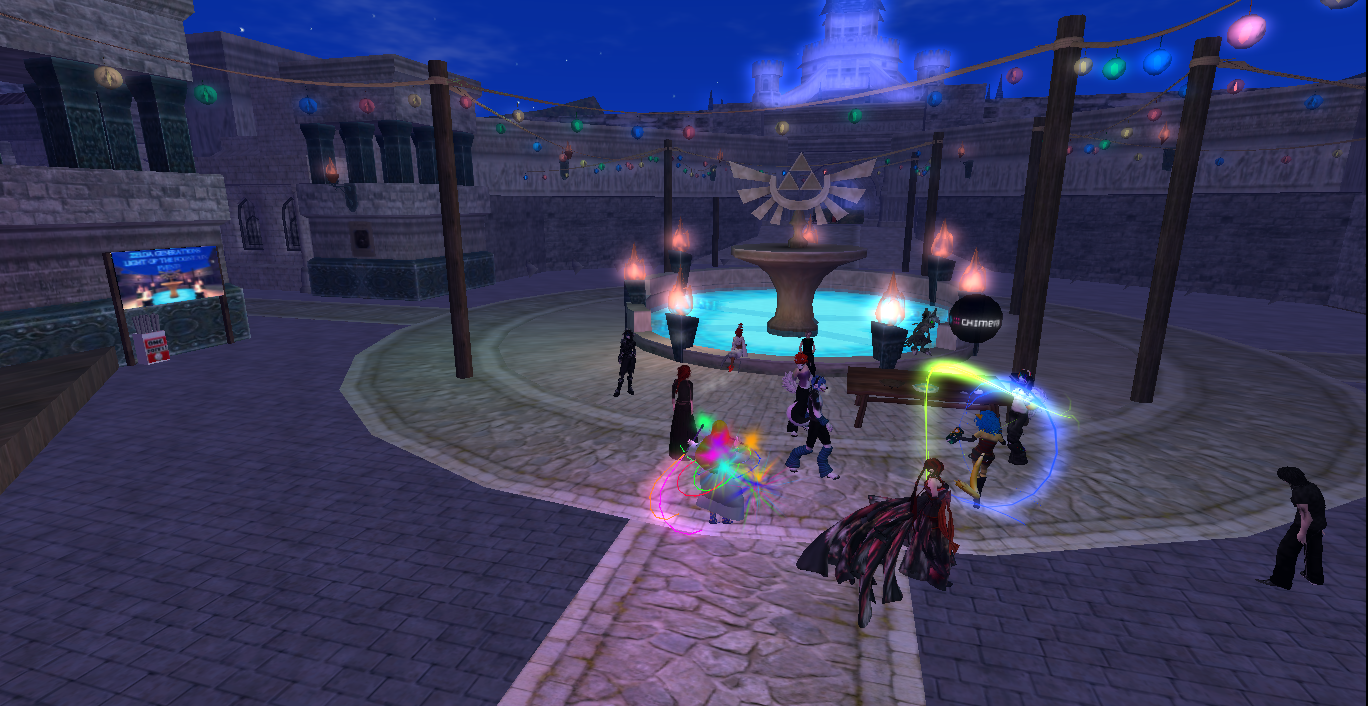
A party scene from Second Life set in Hyrule

Virtual worlds are the most interactive of all virtual community forms. In this type of virtual community, people are connected by living as an avatar in a computer-based world. Users create their own avatar character (from choosing the avatar's outfits to designing the avatar's house) and control their character's life and interactions with other characters in the 3D virtual world. It is similar to a computer game; however, there is no objective for the players. A virtual world simply gives users the opportunity to build and operate a fantasy life in the virtual realm. Characters within the world can talk to one another and have almost the same interactions people would have in reality. For example, characters can socialize with one another and hold intimate relationships online.

This type of virtual community allows for people to not only hold conversations with others in real time, but also to engage and interact with others. The avatars that users create are like humans. Users can choose to make avatars like themselves, or take on an entirely different personality than them. When characters interact with other characters, they can get to know one another through text-based talking and virtual experience (such as having avatars go on a date in the virtual world). A virtual community chat room may give real-time conversations, but people can only talk to one another. In a virtual world, characters can do activities together, just like friends could do in reality. Communities in virtual worlds are most similar to real-life communities because the characters are physically in the same place, even if the users who are operating the characters are not. Second Life is one of the most popular virtual worlds on the Internet. Whyville offers an alternative for younger audiences where safety and privacy are a concern. In Whyville, players use the virtual world's simulation aspect to experiment and learn about various phenomena.

Another use for virtual worlds has been in business communications. Benefits from virtual world technology such as photo realistic avatars and positional sound create an atmosphere for participants that provides a less fatiguing sense of presence. Enterprise controls that allow the meeting host to dictate the permissions of the attendees such as who can speak, or who can move about allow the host to control the meeting environment. Zoom, is a popular platform that has grown over the COVID-19 pandemic. Where those who host meetings on this platform, can dictate who can or cannot speak, by muting or unmuting them, along with who is able to join. Several companies are creating business based virtual worlds including Second Life. These business based worlds have stricter controls and allow functionality such as muting individual participants, desktop sharing, or access lists to provide a highly interactive and controlled virtual world to a specific business or group. Business based virtual worlds also may provide various enterprise features such as Single Sign on with third party providers, or Content Encryption.

=== Social network services ===
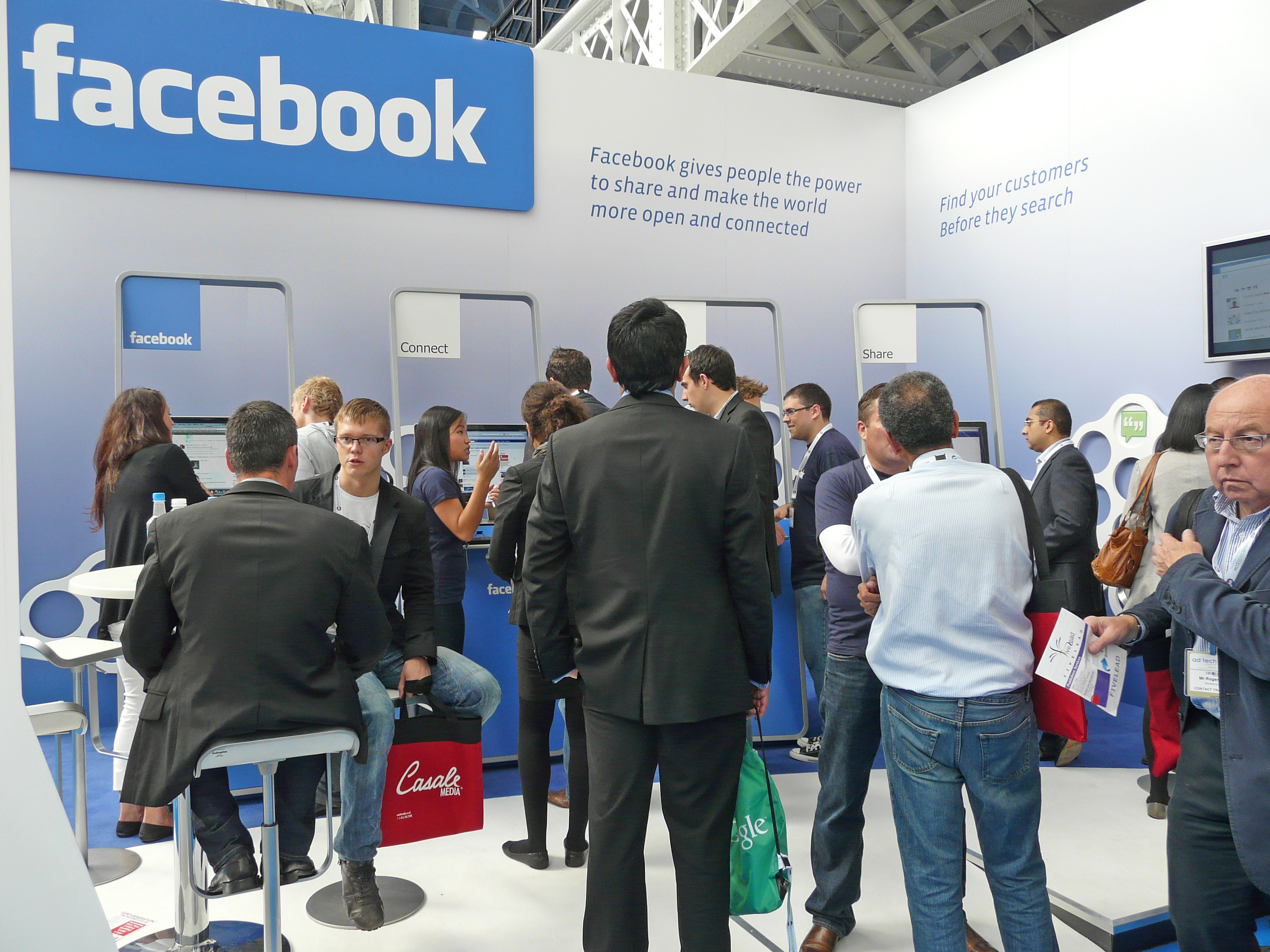
Facebook on the Ad-tech 2010

Social networking services are the most prominent type of virtual community. They are either a website or software platform that focuses on creating and maintaining relationships. Facebook, Twitter, and Instagram are all virtual communities. With these sites, one often creates a profile or account, and adds friends or follow friends. This allows people to connect and look for support using the social networking service as a gathering place. These websites often allow for people to keep up to date with their friends and acquaintances' activities without making much of an effort. On several of these sites you may be able to video chat, with several people at once, making the connections feel more like you are together. On Facebook, for example, one can upload photos and videos, chat, make friends, reconnect with old ones, and join groups or causes.

=== Specialized information communities ===
Participatory culture plays a large role in online and virtual communities. In participatory culture, users feel that their contributions are important and that by contributing, they are forming meaningful connections with other users. The differences between being a producer of content on the website and being a consumer on the website become blurred and overlap. According to Henry Jenkins, "Members believe their contributions matter and feel some degree of social connection with one another "(Jenkins, et al. 2005). The exchange and consumption of information requires a degree of "digital literacy", such that users are able to "archive, annotate, appropriate, transform and recirculate media content" (Jenkins). Specialized information communities centralizes a specific group of users who are all interested in the same topic. For example, TasteofHome.com, the website of the magazine Taste of Home, is a specialized information community that focuses on baking and cooking. The users contribute consumer information relating to their hobby and additionally participate in further specialized groups and forums. Specialized Information Communities are a place where people with similar interests can discuss and share their experiences and interests.

== Building communities ==
Dorine C. Andrews argues, in the article "Audience-Specific Online Community Design", that there are three parts to building an online community: starting the online community, encouraging early online interaction, and moving to a self-sustaining interactive environment. When starting an online community, it may be effective to create webpages that appeal to specific interests. Online communities with clear topics and easy access tend to be most effective. In order to gain early interaction by members, privacy guarantees and content discussions are very important. Successful online communities tend to be able to function self-sufficiently.

=== Participation ===
There are two major types of participation in online communities: public participation and non-public participation, also called lurking. Lurkers are participants who join a virtual community but do not contribute. In contrast, public participants, or posters, are those who join virtual communities and openly express their beliefs and opinions. Both lurkers and posters frequently enter communities to find answers and to gather general information. For example, there are several online communities dedicated to technology. In these communities, posters are generally experts in the field who can offer technological insight and answer questions, while lurkers tend to be technological novices who use the communities to find answers and to learn.

In general, virtual community participation is influenced by how participants view themselves in society as well as by norms, both of society and of the online community. Participants also join online communities for friendship and support. In a sense, virtual communities may fill social voids in participants' offline lives.

Sociologist Barry Wellman presents the idea of "globalization" – the Internet's ability to extend participants' social connections to people around the world while also aiding them in further engagement with their local communities.

==== Roles in an online community ====
Although online societies differ in content from real society, the roles people assume in their online communities are quite similar. Elliot Volkman points out several categories of people that play a role in the cycle of social networking, such as:

- Community architect – Creates the online community, sets goals and decides the purpose of the site.
- Community manager – Oversees the progress of the society. Enforces rules, encourages social norms, assists new members, and spreads awareness about the community.
- Professional member – This is a member who is paid to contribute to the site. The purpose of this role is to keep the community active.
- Free members – These members visit sites most often and represent the majority of the contributors. Their contributions are crucial to the sites' progress.
- Passive lurker – These people do not contribute to the site but rather absorb the content, discussion, and advice.
- Active lurker – Consumes the content and shares that content with personal networks and other communities.
- Power users – These people push for new discussion, provide positive feedback to community managers, and sometimes even act as community managers themselves. They have a major influence on the site and make up only a small percentage of the users.

=== Aspects of successful online communities ===
An article entitled "The real value of on-line communities," written by A. Armstrong and John Hagel of the Harvard Business Review, addresses a handful of elements that are key to the growth of an online community and its success in drawing in members. In this example, the article focuses specifically on online communities related to business, but its points can be transferred and can apply to any online community. The article addresses four main categories of business-based online communities, but states that a truly successful one will combine qualities of each of them: communities of transaction, communities of interest, communities of fantasy, and communities of relationship. Anubhav Choudhury describes the four types of community as follows:

1. Communities of transaction emphasize the importance of buying and selling products in a social online manner where people must interact in order to complete the transaction.
2. Communities of interest involve the online interaction of people with specific knowledge on a certain topic.
3. Communities of fantasy encourage people to participate in online alternative forms of reality, such as games where they are represented by avatars.
4. Communities of relationship often reveal or at least partially protect someone's identity while allowing them to communicate with others, such as in online dating services.

== Membership lifecycle ==
Amy Jo Kim's membership lifecycle theory states that members of online communities begin their life in a community as visitors, or lurkers. After breaking through a barrier, people become novices and participate in community life. After contributing for a sustained period of time, they become regulars. If they break through another barrier they become leaders, and once they have contributed to the community for some time they become elders. This life cycle can be applied to many virtual communities, such as bulletin board systems, blogs, mailing lists, and wiki-based communities like Wikipedia.

A similar model can be found in the works of Lave and Wenger, who illustrate a cycle of how users become incorporated into virtual communities using the principles of legitimate peripheral participation. They suggest five types of trajectories amongst a learning community:

1. Peripheral (i.e. Lurker) – An outside, unstructured participation
2. Inbound (i.e. Novice) – Newcomer is invested in the community and heading towards full participation
3. Insider (i.e. Regular) – Full committed community participant
4. Boundary (i.e. Leader) – A leader, sustains membership participation and brokers interactions
5. Outbound (i.e. Elder) – Process of leaving the community due to new relationships, new positions, new outlooks

The following shows the correlation between the learning trajectories and Web 2.0 community participation by using the example of YouTube:

- Peripheral (Lurker) – Observing the community and viewing content. Does not add to the community content or discussion. The user occasionally goes onto YouTube.com to check out a video that someone has directed them to.
- Inbound (Novice) – Just beginning to engage with the community. Starts to provide content. Tentatively interacts in a few discussions. The user comments on other users' videos. Potentially posts a video of their own.
- Insider (Regular) – Consistently adds to the community discussion and content. Interacts with other users. Regularly posts videos. Makes a concerted effort to comment and rate other users' videos.
- Boundary (Leader) – Recognized as a veteran participant, their opinions are granted greater consideration by the community. Connects with regulars to make higher-concept ideas. The user has become recognized as a contributor to watch. Their videos may be podcasts commenting on the state of YouTube and its community. The user would not consider watching another user's videos without commenting on them. Will often correct a user in behavior the community considers inappropriate. Will reference other users' videos in their comments as a way to cross link content.
- Outbound (Elders) – Leave the community. Their interests may have changed, the community may have moved in a direction that they disagree with, or they may no longer have time to maintain a constant presence in the community.

=== Newcomers ===
Newcomers are important for online communities. Online communities rely on volunteers' contribution, and most online communities face high turnover rate as one of their main challenges. For example, only a minority of Wikipedia users contribute regularly, and only a minority of those contributors participate in community discussions. In one study conducted by Carnegie Mellon University, they found that "more than two-thirds (68%) of newcomers to Usenet groups were never seen again after their first post". Above facts reflect a point that recruiting and remaining new members have become a very crucial problem for online communities: the communities will eventually wither away without replacing members who leave.

Newcomers are new members of the online communities and thus often face many barriers when contributing to a project, and those barriers they face might lead them to give up the project or even leave the community. By conducting a systematic literature review over 20 primary studies regarding to the barriers faced by newcomers when contributing to the open source software projects, Steinmacher et al. identified 15 different barriers and they classified those barriers into five categories as described below:

1. Social Interaction: this category describes the barriers when newcomers interact with existing members of the community. The three barriers that they found have main influence on newcomers are: "lack of social interaction with project members",'"not receiving a timely response", and "receiving an improper response".
2. Newcomers' Previous Knowledge: this category describes the barriers which is regarding to the newcomers' previous experience related to this project. The three barriers they found classified into this part are: "lack of domain expertise", "lack of technical expertise", and "lack of knowledge of project practices".
3. Finding a Way to Start: this category describes the issues when newcomers try to start contributing. The two barriers they found are: "Difficulty to find an appropriate task to start with", and "Difficulty to find a mentor".
4. Documentation: documentation of the project also shown to be barriers for newcomers especially in the Open Source Software projects. The three barriers they found are: "Outdated documentation", "Too much documentation", and "Unclear code comments".
5. Technical Hurdles: technical barriers are also one of the major issue when newcomers start contributing. This category includes barriers: "Issues setting up a local workspace", "Code complexity" and "Software architecture complexity".

Because of the barriers described above, it is very necessary that online communities engage newcomers and help them to adjust to the new environment. From online communities' side, newcomers can be both beneficial and harmful to online communities. On the one side, newcomers can bring online communities innovative ideas and resources. On the other side, they can also harm communities with misbehavior caused by their unfamiliarity with community norms. Kraut et al. defined five basic issues faced by online communities when dealing with newcomers, and proposed several design claims for each problem in their book Building Successful Online Communities.

1. Recruitment. Online communities need to keep recruiting new members in the face of high turnover rate of their existing members. Three suggestions are made in the book:
  - Interpersonal recruitment: recruit new members by old members' personal relationship
  - Word of mouth recruitment: new members will join in the community because of the word-of-mouth influence from existing member
  - Impersonal advertisement: although the direct effect is weaker than previous two strategies, impersonal advertising can effectively increase number of people joining among potential members with little prior knowledge of the community.
2. Selection. Another challenge for online communities is to select the members who are a good fit. Unlike the offline organizations, the problem of selecting right candidates is more problematic for online communities since the anonymity of the users and the ease of creating new identities online. Two approaches are suggested in the book:
  - Self-selection: make sure that only good fit members will choose to join.
  - Screen: make sure that only good fit members will allow to join.
3. Keeping Newcomers Around. Before new members start feel the commitment and do major contribution, they must be around long enough in online communities to learn the norms and form the community attachment. However, the majority of them tend to leave the communities at this period of time. At this period of time, new members are usually very sensitive to either positive or negative evidence they received from group, which may largely impact the users' decision on whether they quit or stay. Authors suggested two approaches:
  - Entry Barriers: Higher entry barriers will be more likely to drive away new members, but those members who survived from this severe initiation process should have stronger commitment than those members with lower entry barriers.
  - Interactions with existing members: communicating with existing members and receiving friendly responses from them will encourage the new members' commitment. The existing members are encouraged to treat the newcomers gently. One study by Halfaker et al. suggested that reverting new members' work in Wikipedia will likely to make them leave the communities. Thus, new members are more likely to stay and develop commitment if the interaction between existing member and new members are friendly and gentle. The book suggested different ways, including "introduction threads" in the communities, "assign the responsibilities of having friendly interactions with newcomers to designated older-timers", and "discouraging hostility towards newcomers who make mistakes".
4. Socialization. Different online communities have their own norms and regulations, and new members need to learn to participate in an appropriate way. Thus, socialization is a process through which new members acquire the behaviors and attitude essential to playing their roles in a group or organization. Previous research in organizational socialization demonstrated that newcomers' active information seeking and organizational socialization tactics are associated with better performance, higher job satisfaction, more committed to the organization, more likely to stay and thus lower turnover rate. However, this institutionalized socialization tactics are not popular used in online setting, and most online communities are still using the individualized socialization tactics where newcomers being socialized individually and in a more informal way in their training process. Thus, in order to keep new members, the design suggestions given by this book are: "using formal, sequential and collective socialization tactics" and "old-timers can provide formal mentorship to newcomers."
5. Protection. Newcomers are different from the existing members, and thus the influx of newcomers might change the environment or the culture developed by existing members. New members might also behave inappropriately, and thus be potentially harmful to online communities, as a result of their lack of experience. Different communities might also have different level of damage tolerance, some might be more fragile to newcomers' inappropriate behavior (such as open source group collaboration software project) while others are not (such as some discussion forums). So the speed of integrating new members with existing communities really depends on community types and its goals, and groups need to have protection mechanisms that serve to multiple purposes.

== Motivations and barriers to participation ==
=== Motivations ===
Successful online communities motivate online participation. Methods of motivating participation in these communities have been investigated in several studies.

There are many persuasive factors that draw users into online communities. Peer-to-peer systems and social networking sites rely heavily on member contribution. Users' underlying motivations to involve themselves in these communities have been linked to some persuasion theories of sociology.

- According to the reciprocation theory, a successful online community must provide its users with benefits that compensate for the costs of time, effort and materials members provide. People often join these communities expecting some sort of reward.
- The consistency theory says that once people make a public commitment to a virtual society, they will often feel obligated to stay consistent with their commitment by continuing contributions.
- The social validation theory explains how people are more likely to join and participate in an online community if it is socially acceptable and popular.

One of the reasons users join online communities is the sense of connection they develop with other members. Participation and contribution are influenced when members of an online community are aware of their global audience.

The majority of people learn by example and often follow others, especially when it comes to participation. Individuals are reserved about contributing to an online community for many reasons including but not limited to a fear of criticism or inaccuracy. Users may withhold information that they do not believe is particularly interesting, relevant, or truthful. In order to challenge these contribution barriers, producers of these sites are responsible for developing knowledge-based and foundation-based trust among the community.

Users' perception of audience is another reason that makes users participate in online communities. Results showed that users usually underestimate their amount of audiences in online communities. Social media users guess that their audience is 27% of its real size. Regardless of this underestimation, it is shown that amount of audience affects users' self-presentation and also content production which means a higher level of participation.

There are two types of virtual online communities (VOC): dependent and self-sustained VOCs. The dependent VOCs are those who use the virtual community as extensions of themselves, they interact with people they know. Self-sustained VOCs are communities where relationships between participating members is formed and maintained through encounters in the online community. For all VOCs, there is the issue of creating identity and reputation in the community. People can create whatever identity they would like to through their interactions with other members. The username is what members identify each other by but it says very little about the person behind it. The main features in online communities that attract people are a shared communication environment, relationships formed and nurtured, a sense of belonging to a group, the internal structure of the group, common space shared by people with similar ideas and interests. The three most critical issues are belonging, identity, and interest. For an online community to flourish there needs to be consistent participation, interest, and motivation.

Research conducted by Helen Wang applied the Technology Acceptance Model to online community participation. Internet self-efficacy positively predicted perceived ease of use. Research found that participants' beliefs in their abilities to use the internet and web-based tools determined how much effort was expected. Community environment positively predicted perceived ease of use and usefulness. Intrinsic motivation positively predicted perceived ease of use, usefulness, and actual use. The technology acceptance model positively predicts how likely it is that an individual will participate in an online community.

=== Technical motivations and barriers ===
User experience is the ultimate goal for the program or software used by an internet community, because user experience will determine the software's success. The software for social media pages or virtual communities is structured around the users' experience and designed specifically for online use. User experience testing is utilized to reveal something about the personal experience of the human being using a product or system. When it comes to testing user experience in a software interface, three main characteristics are needed: a user who is engaged, a user who is interacting with a product or interface, and defining the users' experience in ways that are and observable or measurable. User experience metrics are based on a reliability and repeatability, using a consistent set of measurements to result in comparable outcomes. User experience metrics are based on user retention, using a consistent set of measurements to collect data on user experience. The widespread use of the Internet and virtual communities by millions of diverse users for socializing is a phenomenon that raises new issues for researchers and developers. The vast number and diversity of individuals participating in virtual communities worldwide makes it a challenge to test usability across platforms to ensure the best overall user experience. Some well-established measures applied to the usability framework for online communities are speed of learning, productivity, user satisfaction, how much people remember using the software, and how many errors they make. The human computer interactions that are measured during a usability experience test focus on the individuals rather than their social interactions in the online community. The success of online communities depend on the integration of usability and social semiotics. Usability testing metrics can be used to determine social codes by evaluating a user's habits when interacting with a program. Social codes are established and reinforced by the regular repetition of behavioral patterns. People communicate their social identities or culture code through the work they do, the way they talk, the clothes they wear, their eating habits, domestic environments and possessions, and use of leisure time. Usability testing metrics can be used to determine social codes by evaluating a user's habits when interacting with a program. The information provided during a usability test can determine demographic factors and help define the semiotic social code. Dialogue and social interactions, support information design, navigation support, and accessibility are integral components specific to online communities. As virtual communities grow, so do the diversity of their users. However, the technologies are not made to be any more or less intuitive. Usability tests can ensure users are communicating effectively using social and semiotic codes while maintaining their social identities. Efficient communication requires a common set of signs in the minds of those seeking to communicate. As technologies evolve and mature, they tend to be used by an increasingly diverse set of users. This kind of increasing complexity and evolution of technology does no necessarily mean that the technologies are becoming easier to use. Usability testing in virtual communities can ensure users are communicating effectively through social and semiotic codes and maintenance of social realities and identities.

== Consumer-vendor interaction ==
Economically, virtual communities can be commercially successful, making money through membership fees, subscriptions, usage fees, and advertising commission. Consumers generally feel very comfortable making transactions online provided that the seller has a good reputation throughout the community. Virtual communities also provide the advantage of disintermediation in commercial transactions, which eliminates vendors and connects buyers directly to suppliers. Disintermediation eliminates pricey mark-ups and allows for a more direct line of contact between the consumer and the manufacturer.

Establishing a relationship between the consumer and a seller in online communities has become the object of study. The profits of sellers depend on how they use relationships built in online communities. Online communities gather people around common interests and these common interests can include brands, products, and services. Companies not only have a chance to reach a new group of consumers in online communities, but to also tap into information about the consumers. Companies have a chance to learn about the consumers in an environment that they feel a certain amount of anonymity and are thus, more open to allowing a company to see what they really want or are looking for.

In order to establish a relationship with the consumer a company must seek a way to identify with how individuals interact with the community. This is done by understanding the relationships an individual has with an online community. There are six identifiable relationship statuses: considered status, committed status, inactive status, faded status, recognized status, and unrecognized status. Unrecognized status means the consumer is unaware of the online community or has not decided the community to be useful. The recognized status is where a person is aware of the community, but is not entirely involved. A considered status is when a person begins their involvement with the site. The usage at this stage is still very sporadic. The committed status is when a relationship between a person and an online community is established and the person gets fully involved with the community. The inactive status is when an online community has not relevance to a person. The faded status is when a person has begun to fade away from a site. It is important to be able to recognize which group or status the consumer holds, because it might help determine which approach to use.

Companies not only need to understand how a consumer functions within an online community, but also a company "should understand the communality of an online community" This means a company must understand the dynamic and structure of the online community to be able to establish a relationship with the consumer. Online communities have cultures of their own, and to be able to establish a commercial relationship or even engage at all, one must understand the community values and proprieties. It has even been proved beneficial to treat online commercial relationships more as friendships rather than business transactions.

Through online engagement, because of the smoke screen of anonymity, it allows a person to be able to socially interact with strangers in a much more personal way. This personal connection the consumer feels translates to how they want to establish relationships online. They separate what is commercial or spam and what is relational. Relational becomes what they associate with human interaction while commercial is what they associate with digital or non-human interaction. Thus the online community should not be viewed as "merely a sales channel". Instead it should be viewed as a network for establishing interpersonal communications with the consumer.

== Growth cycle ==
Most online communities grow slowly at first, due in part to the fact that the strength of motivation for contributing is usually proportional to the size of the community. As the size of the potential audience increases, so does the attraction of writing and contributing. This, coupled with the fact that organizational culture does not change overnight, means creators can expect slow progress at first with a new virtual community. As more people begin to participate, however, the aforementioned motivations will increase, creating a virtuous cycle in which more participation begets more participation.

Community adoption can be forecast with the Bass diffusion model, originally conceived by Frank Bass to describe the process by which new products get adopted as an interaction between innovative early adopters and those who follow them.

== Online learning community ==
Online learning is a form of online community. The sites are designed to educate. Colleges and universities may offer many of their classes online to their students; this allows each student to take the class at his or her own pace.

According to an article published in volume 21, issue 5 of the European Management Journal titled "Learning in Online Forums", researchers conducted a series of studies about online learning. They found that while good online learning is difficult to plan, it is quite conducive to educational learning. Online learning can bring together a diverse group of people, and although it is asynchronous learning, if the forum is set up using all the best tools and strategies, it can be very effective.

Another study was published in volume 55, issue 1 of Computers and Education and found results supporting the findings of the article mentioned above. The researchers found that motivation, enjoyment, and team contributions on learning outcomes enhanced students learning and that the students felt they learned well with it. A study published in the same journal looks at how social networking can foster individual well-being and develop skills which can improve the learning experience.

These articles look at a variety of different types of online learning. They suggest that online learning can be quite productive and educational if created and maintained properly.

One feature of online communities is that they are not constrained by time thereby giving members the ability to move through periods of high to low activity over a period of time. This dynamic nature maintains a freshness and variety that traditional methods of learning might not have been able to provide.

It appears that online communities such as Wikipedia have become a source of professional learning. They are an active learning environment in which learners converse and inquire.

In a study exclusive to teachers in online communities, results showed that membership in online communities provided teachers with a rich source of professional learning that satisfied each member of the community.

Saurabh Tyagi describes benefits of online community learning which include:

- No physical boundaries: Online communities do not limit their membership nor exclude based on where one lives.
- Supports in-class learning: Due to time constraints, discussion boards are more efficient for question & answer sessions than allowing time after lectures to ask questions.
- Build a social and collaborative learning experience: People are best able to learn when they engage, communicate, and collaborate with each other. Online communities create an environment where users can collaborate through social interaction and shared experiences.
- Self-governance: Anyone who can access the internet is self-empowered. The immediate access to information allows users to educate themselves.

These terms are taken from Edudemic, a site about teaching and learning. The article "How to Build Effective Online Learning Communities" provides background information about online communities as well as how to incorporate learning within an online community.

== Video gaming and online interactions ==
One of the greatest attractions towards online communities and the role assigned to an online community, is the sense of connection in which users are able to build among other members and associates. Thus, it is typical to reference online communities when regarding the 'gaming' universe. The online video game industry has embraced the concepts of cooperative and diverse gaming in order to provide players with a sense of community or togetherness. Video games have long been seen as a solo endeavor – as a way to escape reality and leave social interaction at the door. Yet, online community networks or talk pages have now allowed forms of connection with other users. These connections offer forms of aid in the games themselves, as well as an overall collaboration and interaction in the network space. For example, a study conducted by Pontus Strimling and Seth Frey found that players would generate their own models of fair "loot" distribution through community interaction if they felt that the model provided by the game itself was insufficient.

The popularity of competitive the online multiplayer games has now even promoted informal social interaction through the use of the recognized communities.

=== Multiplayer video game services ===
- Battle.net
- Garena
- GameRanger
- Nintendo Switch Online
- PlayStation Network
- Steam
- Ubisoft Connect
- WeGame
- Xbox network

=== Problems with online gaming communities ===
As with other online communities, problems do arise when approaching the usages of online communities in the gaming culture, as well as those who are utilizing the spaces for their own agendas. "Gaming culture" offers individuals personal experiences, development of creativity, as well an assemblance of togetherness that potentially resembles formalized social communication techniques. On the other hand, these communities could also include toxicity, online disinhibition, and cyberbullying.

- Toxicity: Toxicity in games usually takes the form of abusive or negative language or behavior.
- Online disinhibition: The utilization in gaming communities to say things that normally would not have been said in an in-person scenario. Offers the individual the access to less restraintion culturally appropriated interactions, and is typically through the form of aggressiveness. This action is also typically offered through the form of anonymity.
  - Dissociative anonymity
  - Invisibility
  - Power of status and authority
- Cyberbullying: Cyberbullying stems from various levels of degree, but inevitably is cast as abuse and harassment in nature.

== Online health community ==
Online health communities is one example of online communities which is heavily used by internet users. A key benefit of online health communities is providing user access to other users with similar problems or experiences which has a significant impact on the lives of their members. Through people participation, online health communities will be able to offer patients opportunities for emotional support and also will provide them access to experience-based information about particular problem or possible treatment strategies. Even in some studies, it is shown that users find experienced-based information more relevant than information which was prescribed by professionals. Moreover, allowing patients to collaborate anonymously in some of online health communities suggests users a non-judgmental environment to share their problems, knowledge, and experiences. However, recent research has indicated that socioeconomic differences between patients may result in feelings of alienation or exclusion within these communities, even despite attempts to make the environments inclusive.

== Effects ==
=== On health ===
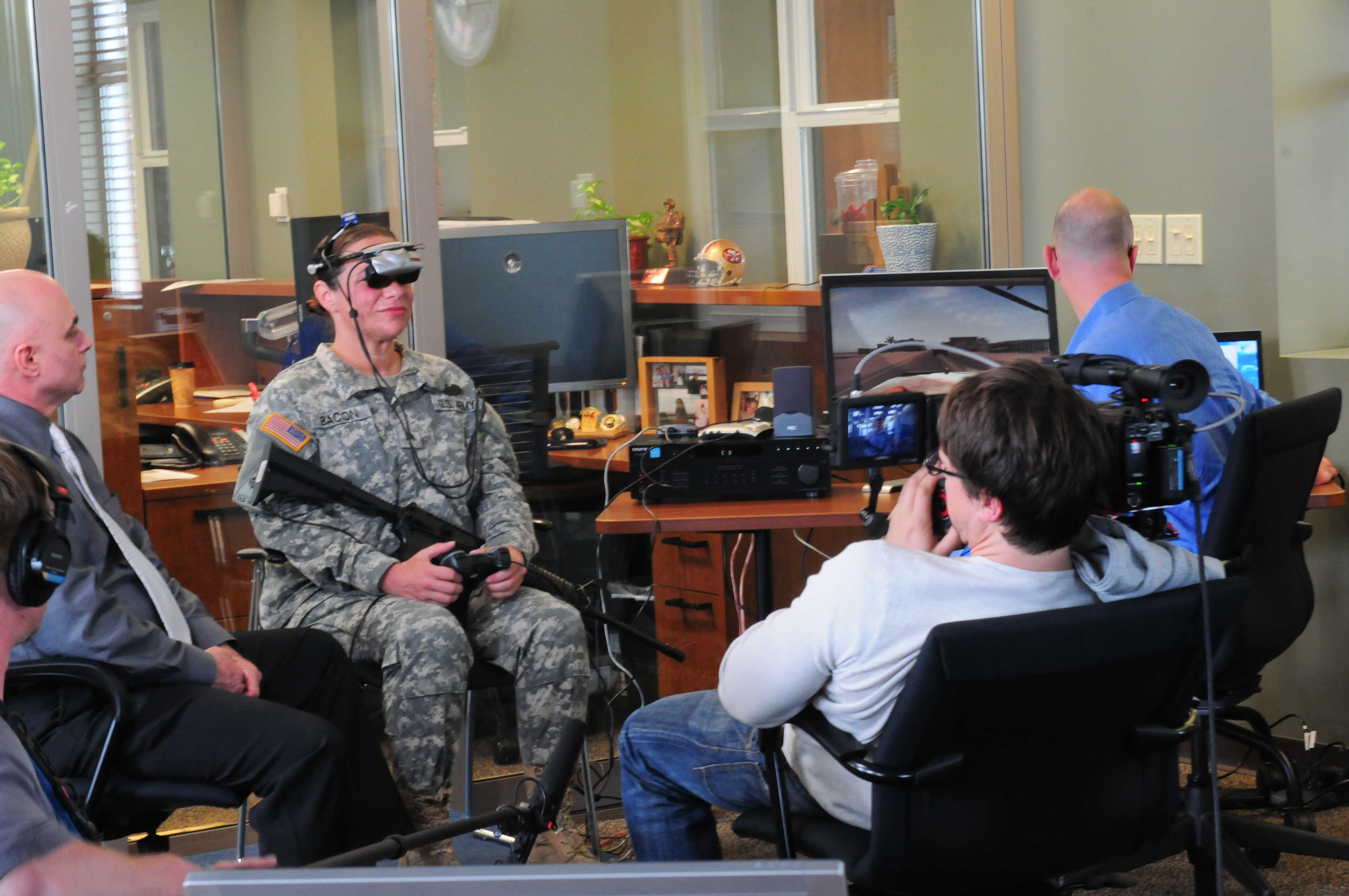
A Virtual therapy session for PTSD

Recent studies have looked into development of health related communities and their impact on those already suffering health issues. These forms of social networks allow for open conversation between individuals who are going through similar experiences, whether themselves or in their family. Such sites have so grown in popularity that now many health care providers form groups for their patients by providing web areas where one may direct questions to doctors. These sites prove especially useful when related to rare medical conditions. People with rare or debilitating disorders may not be able to access support groups in their physical community, thus online communities act as primary means for such support. Online health communities can serve as supportive outlets as they facilitate connecting with others who truly understand the disease, as well as offer more practical support, such as receiving help in adjusting to life with the disease. Each patient on online health communities are on there for different reasons, as some may need quick answers to questions they have, or someone to talk to.Involvement in social communities of similar health interests has created a means for patients to develop a better understanding and behavior towards treatment and health practices. Some of these users could have very serious life-threatening issues which these personal contexts could become very helpful to these users, as the issues are very complex. Patients increasingly use such outlets, as this is providing personalized and emotional support and information, that will help them and have a better experience. The extent to which these practices have effects on health are still being studied.

Studies on health networks have mostly been conducted on groups which typically suffer the most from extreme forms of diseases, for example cancer patients, HIV patients, or patients with other life-threatening diseases. It is general knowledge that one participates in online communities to interact with society and develop relationships. Individuals who suffer from rare or severe illnesses are unable to meet physically because of distance or because it could be a risk to their health to leave a secure environment. Thus, they have turned to the internet.

Some studies have indicated that virtual communities can provide valuable benefits to their users. Online health-focused communities were shown to offer a unique form of emotional support that differed from event-based realities and informational support networks. Growing amounts of presented material show how online communities affect the health of their users. Apparently the creation of health communities has a positive impact on those who are ill or in need of medical information.

=== On civic participation ===
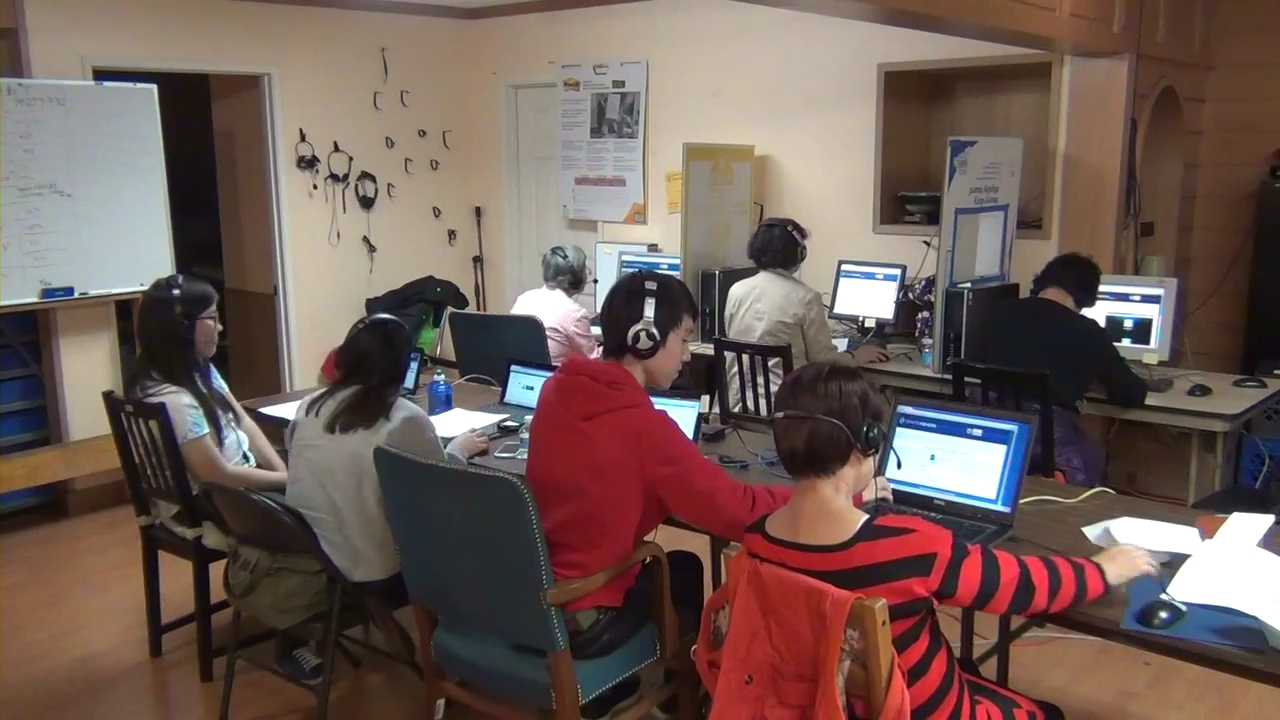
Young citizens involved in civic engagement

It was found that young individuals are more bored with politics and history topics, and instead are more interested in celebrity dramas and topics. Young individuals claim that "voicing what you feel" does not mean "being heard", so they feel the need to not participate in these engagements, as they believe they are not being listened to anyway. Over the years, things have changed, as new forms of civic engagement and citizenship have emerged from the rise of social networking sites. Networking sites act as a medium for expression and discourse about issues in specific user communities. Online content-sharing sites have made it easy for youth as well as others to not only express themselves and their ideas through digital media, but also connect with large networked communities. Within these spaces, young people are pushing the boundaries of traditional forms of engagement such as voting and joining political organizations and creating their own ways to discuss, connect, and act in their communities.

Civic engagement through online volunteering has shown to have positive effects on personal satisfaction and development. Some 84 percent of online volunteers found that their online volunteering experience had contributed to their personal development and learning.

=== On communication ===
In his book The Wealth of Networks from 2006, Yochai Benkler suggests that virtual communities would "come to represent a new form of human communal existence, providing new scope for building a shared experience of human interaction". Although Benkler's prediction has not become entirely true, clearly communications and social relations are extremely complex within a virtual community. The two main effects that can be seen according to Benkler are a "thickening of preexisting relations with friends, family and neighbours" and the beginnings of the "emergence of greater scope for limited-purpose, loose relationships". Despite being acknowledged as "loose" relationships, Benkler argues that they remain meaningful.

Previous concerns about the effects of Internet use on community and family fell into two categories: 1) sustained, intimate human relations "are critical to well-functioning human beings as a matter of psychological need" and 2) people with "social capital" are better off than those who lack it. It leads to better results in terms of political participation. However, Benkler argues that unless Internet connections actually displace direct, unmediated, human contact, there is no basis to think that using the Internet will lead to a decline in those nourishing connections we need psychologically, or in the useful connections we make socially. Benkler continues to suggest that the nature of an individual changes over time, based on social practices and expectations. There is a shift from individuals who depend upon locally embedded, unmediated and stable social relationships to networked individuals who are more dependent upon their own combination of strong and weak ties across boundaries and weave their own fluid relationships. Manuel Castells calls this the "networked society".

=== On identity ===
In 1997, MCI Communications released the "Anthem" advertisement, heralding the internet as a utopia without age, race, or gender. Lisa Nakamura argues in chapter 16 of her 2002 book After/image of identity: Gender, Technology, and Identity Politics, that technology gives us iterations of our age, race and gender in virtual spaces, as opposed to them being fully extinguished. Nakamura uses a metaphor of "after-images" to describe the cultural phenomenon of expressing identity on the internet. The idea is that any performance of identity on the internet is simultaneously present and past-tense, "posthuman and projectionary", due to its immortality.

Sherry Turkle, professor of Social Studies of Science and Technology at MIT, believes the internet is a place where actions of discrimination are less likely to occur. In her 1995 book Life on the Screen: Identity in the Age of the Internet, she argues that discrimination is easier in reality as it is easier to identify as face value, what is contrary to one's norm. The internet allows for a more fluid expression of identity and thus people become more accepting of inconsistent personae within themselves and others. For these reasons, Turkle argues users existing in online spaces are less compelled to judge or compare themselves to their peers, allowing people in virtual settings an opportunity to gain a greater capacity for acknowledging diversity.

Nakamura argues against this view, coining the term identity tourism in her 1999 article "Race In/For Cyberspace: Identity Tourism and Racial Passing on the Internet". Identity tourism, in the context of cyberspace, is a term used to the describe the phenomenon of users donning and doffing other-race and other-gender personae. Nakamura finds that performed behavior from these identity tourists often perpetuate stereotypes.

In the 1998 book Communities in Cyberspace, authors Marc A. Smith and Peter Kollock, perceives the interactions with strangers are based upon with whom we are speaking or interacting with. People use everything from clothes, voice, body language, gestures, and power to identify others, which plays a role with how they will speak or interact with them. Smith and Kollock believes that online interactions breaks away of all of the face-to-face gestures and signs that people tend to show in front of one another. Although this is difficult to do online, it also provides space to play with one's identity.

==== Gender ====
The gaming community is extremely vast and accessible to a wide variety of people, However, there are negative effects on the relationships "gamers" have with the medium when expressing identity of gender. Adrienne Shaw notes in her 2012 article "Do you identify as a gamer? Gender, race, sexuality, and gamer identity", that gender, perhaps subconsciously, plays a large role in identifying oneself as a "gamer". According to Lisa Nakamura, representation in video games has become a problem, as the minority of players from different backgrounds who are not just the stereotyped white teen male gamer are not represented.

== Problems ==
Online communities are relatively new and unexplored areas. They promote a whole new community that prior to the Internet was not available. Although they can promote a vast array of positive qualities, such as relationships without regard to race, religion, gender, or geography, they can also lead to multiple problems.

The theory of risk perception, an uncertainty in participating in an online community, is quite common, particularly when in the following online circumstances:

1. performances,
2. financial,
3. opportunity/time,
4. safety,
5. social,
6. psychological loss.

Clay Shirky explains one of these problems like two hoola-hoops. With the emersion of online communities there is a "real life" hoola-hoop and the other and "online life". These two hoops used to be completely separate but now they have swung together and overlap. The problem with this overlap is that there is no distinction anymore between face-to-face interactions and virtual ones; they are one and the same. Shirky illustrates this by explaining a meeting. A group of people will sit in a meeting but they will all be connected into a virtual world also, using online communities such as wiki.

A further problem is identity formation with the ambiguous real-virtual life mix. Identity formation in the real world consisted of "one body, one identity", but the online communities allow you to create "as many electronic personae" as you please. This can lead to identity deception. Claiming to be someone you are not can be problematic with other online community users and for yourself. Creating a false identity can cause confusion and ambivalence about which identity is true.

A lack of trust regarding personal or professional information is problematic with questions of identity or information reciprocity. Often, if information is given to another user of an online community, one expects equal information shared back. However, this may not be the case or the other user may use the information given in harmful ways. The construction of an individual's identity within an online community requires self-presentation. Self-presentation is the act of "writing the self into being", in which a person's identity is formed by what that person says, does, or shows. This also poses a potential problem as such self-representation is open for interpretation as well as misinterpretation. While an individual's online identity can be entirely constructed with a few of his/her own sentences, perceptions of this identity can be entirely misguided and incorrect.

Online communities present the problems of preoccupation, distraction, detachment, and desensitization to an individual, although online support groups exist now. Online communities do present potential risks, and users must remember to be careful and remember that just because an online community feels safe does not mean it necessarily is.

=== Online Community Brutalization ===
In particular, Sibai, Luedicke and de Valck (2024) have shown that verbally violent behaviors in online communities, commonly viewed as shortlived and situational, rooted in the behaviors of specific members, are in fact often endemic features of online communities. For example, Reddit, which hosts about a million communities, was tagged in the media as the most hateful space on the Internet, Twitch was deemed a dark platform with a toxic community culture, and Discord was reported having to shut down nearly 30,000 communities across the site for various types of abuse. This phenomenon, known as brutalization, was theorized as resulting from oppressive community structures (structural violence) and narratives justifying violent behaviors and community structures (cultural violence) which perpetuate the suppression of community members needs for entertainment, recognition and/or justice and promote the reproduction of violent behaviors.

The authors found that brutalization tends to take three main forms. First, sadistic entertainment where members engaging in trolling games, in communities organized around the survival of the funniest (hedonic darwinism) and embracing cultural narratives of harmless play, whereby everything is just a performance and no real harm can be done. Second, clan warfare, where groups of members engage in status battles. This happens in communities where a particular group of members abuse their dominant position in the community (clan tyranny) and narratives of degradation of the community's culture prevail. Third, popular justice involves members verbally lynching perceived transgressors of community norms. This happens in context of minarchy, where the moderating team fails to enforce community norms, leaving it to members to fend for their communities and narratives of fair punishment develop.

=== Trolling and harassment ===
Cyber bullying, the "use of long-term aggressive, intentional, repetitive acts by one or more individuals, using electronic means, against an almost powerless victim" which has increased in frequency alongside the continued growth of web communities with an Open University study finding 38% of young people had experienced or witnessed cyber bullying. It has received significant media attention due to high-profile incidents such as the death of Amanda Todd who before her death detailed her ordeal on YouTube.

A factor in cyberbullying is that users generally don't have to show their face, which can lead to threatening and discriminating acts towards other people based on the perception of not facing any consequences.

A key feature of such bullying is that it allows victims to be harassed at all times, something not possible typically with physical bullying. This has forced Governments and other organisations to change their typical approach to bullying with the UK Department for Education now issuing advice to schools on how to deal with cyber bullying cases.

The most common problem with online communities tend to be online harassment, meaning threatening or offensive content aimed at known friends or strangers through ways of online technology. Where such posting is done "for the lulz" (that is, for the fun of it), then it is known as trolling. Sometimes trolling is done in order to harm others for the gratification of the person posting. The primary motivation for such posters, known in character theory as "snerts", is the sense of power and exposure it gives them. Online harassment tends to affect adolescents the most due to their risk-taking behavior and decision-making processes. One notable example is that of Natasha MacBryde who was tormented by Sean Duffy, who was later prosecuted. In 2010, Alexis Pilkington, a 17-year-old New Yorker committed suicide. Trolls pounced on her tribute page posting insensitive and hurtful images of nooses and other suicidal symbolism. Four years prior to that an 18-year-old died in a car crash in California. Trolls took images of her disfigured body they found on the internet and used them to torture the girl's grieving parents. Psychological research has shown that anonymity increases unethical behavior through what is called the online disinhibition effect. Many website and online communities have attempted to combat trolling. There has not been a single effective method to discourage anonymity, and arguments exist claiming that removing Internet users' anonymity is an intrusion of their privacy and violates their right to free speech. Julie Zhou, writing for the New York Times, comments that "There's no way to truly rid the Internet of anonymity. After all, names and email addresses can be faked. And in any case many commenters write things that are rude or inflammatory under their real names". Thus, some trolls do not even bother to hide their actions and take pride in their behavior. The rate of reported online harassment has been increasing as there has been a 50% increase in accounts of youth online harassment from the years 2000–2005.

Another form of harassment prevalent online is called flaming. According to a study conducted by Peter J. Moor, flaming is defined as displaying hostility by insulting, swearing or using otherwise offensive language. Flaming can be done in either a group style format (the comments section on YouTube) or in a one-on-one format (private messaging on Facebook). Several studies have shown that flaming is more apparent in computer mediated conversation than in face to face interaction. For example, a study conducted by Kiesler et al. found that people who met online judged each other more harshly than those who met face to face. The study goes on to say that the people who communicated by computer "felt and acted as though the setting was more impersonal, and their behavior was more uninhibited. These findings suggest that computer-mediated communication ... elicits asocial or unregulated behavior".

Unregulated communities are established when online users communicate on a site although there are no mutual terms of usage. There is no regulator. Online interest groups or anonymous blogs are examples of unregulated communities.

Cyberbullying is also prominent online. Cyberbullying is defined as willful and repeated harm inflicted towards another through information technology mediums. Cyberbullying victimization has ascended to the forefront of the public agenda after a number of news stories came out on the topic. For example, Rutgers freshman Tyler Clementi committed suicide in 2010 after his roommate secretly filmed him in an intimate encounter and then streamed the video over the Internet. Numerous states, such as New Jersey, have created and passed laws that do not allow any sort of harassment on, near, or off school grounds that disrupts or interferes with the operation of the school or the rights of other students. In general, sexual and gender-based harassment online has been deemed a significant problem.

Trolling and cyber bullying in online communities are very difficult to stop for several reasons:

1. Community members do not wish to violate libertarian ideologies that state everyone has the right to speak.
2. The distributed nature of online communities make it difficult for members to come to an agreement.
3. Deciding who should moderate and how create difficulty of community management.

In theory, online identities can be kept anonymous which enables people to use the virtual community for fantasy role playing as in the case of Second Life's use of avatars. Risks related to anonymity include online predators looking for victims who are vulnerable to online identity theft.

=== Hazing ===
A lesser known problem is hazing within online communities. Members of an elite online community use hazing to display their power, produce inequality, and instill loyalty into newcomers. While online hazing does not inflict physical duress, "the status values of domination and subordination are just as effectively transmitted". Elite members of the in-group may haze by employing derogatory terms to refer to newcomers, using deception or playing mind games, or participating in intimidation, among other activities.

"[T]hrough hazing, established members tell newcomers that they must be able to tolerate a certain level of aggressiveness, grossness, and obnoxiousness in order to fit in and be accepted by the BlueSky community".

=== Privacy ===
Online communities like social networking websites have a very unclear distinction between private and public information. For most social networks, users have to give personal information to add to their profiles. Usually, users can control what type of information other people in the online community can access based on the users familiarity with the people or the users level of comfort. These limitations are known as "privacy settings". Privacy settings bring up the question of how privacy settings and terms of service affect the expectation of privacy in social media. After all, the purpose of an online community is to share a common space with one another. Furthermore, it is hard to take legal action when a user feels that his or her privacy has been invaded because he or she technically knew what the online community entailed. Creator of the social networking site Facebook, Mark Zuckerberg, noticed a change in users' behavior from when he first initiated Facebook. It seemed that "society's willingness to share has created an environment where privacy concerns are less important to users of social networks today than they were when social networking began". However even though a user might keep his or her personal information private, his or her activity is open to the whole web to access. When a user posts information to a site or comments or responds to information posted by others, social networking sites create a tracking record of the user's activity. Platforms such as Google and Facebook collect massive amounts of this user data through their surveillance infrastructures.

Internet privacy relates to the transmission and storage of a person's data and their right to anonymity whilst online with the UN in 2013 adopting online privacy as a human right by a unanimous vote. Many websites allow users to sign up with a username which need not be their actual name which allows a level of anonymity, in some cases such as the infamous imageboard 4chan users of the site do not need an account to engage with discussions. However, in these cases depending on the detail of information about a person posted it can still be possible to work out a users identity.

Even when a person takes measures to protect their anonymity and privacy revelations by Edward Snowden a former contractor at the Central Intelligence Agency about mass surveillance programs conducted by the US intelligence services involving the mass collection of data on both domestic and international users of popular websites including Facebook and YouTube as well as the collection of information straight from fiber cables without consent appear to show individuals privacy is not always respected. Facebook founder Mark Zuckerberg publicly stated that the company had not been informed of any such programs and only handed over individual users data when required by law implying that if the allegations are true that the data harvested had been done so without the company's consent.

The growing popularity of social networks where a user using their real name is the norm also brings a new challenge with one survey of 2,303 managers finding 37% investigated candidates social media activity during the hiring process with a study showing 1 in 10 job application rejections for those aged 16 to 34 could be due to social media checks.

=== Reliability of information ===
Web communities can be an easy and useful tool to access information. However, the information contained as well as the users' credentials cannot always be trusted, with the internet giving a relatively anonymous medium for some to fraudulently claim anything from their qualifications or where they live to, in rare cases, pretending to be a specific person. Malicious fake accounts created with the aim of defrauding victims out of money has become more high-profile with four men sentenced to between 8 years and 46 weeks for defrauding 12 women out of £250,000 using fake accounts on a dating website. In relation to accuracy one survey based on Wikipedia that evaluated 50 articles found that 24% contained inaccuracies, while in most cases the consequence might just be the spread of misinformation in areas such as health the consequences can be far more damaging leading to the U.S. Food and Drug Administration providing help on evaluating health information on the web.

Communication on the time scales of minutes and hours enables fast interactions, which can lead to information being posted without being reviewed for correctness. It can be difficult to choose reliable sources when there is no editor who reviews each post to check its quality.

=== Imbalance ===
==== Active minority ====
The 1% rule states that within an online community as a rule of thumb only 1% of users actively contribute to creating content. Other variations also exist such as the 1-9-90 rule (1% post and create; 9% share, like, comment; 90% view-only) when taking editing into account. This raises problems for online communities with most users only interested in the information such a community might contain rather than having an interest in actively contributing which can lead to staleness in information and community decline. This has led such communities which rely on user editing of content to promote users into becoming active contributors as well as retention of such existing members through projects such as the Wikimedia Account Creation Improvement Project.

==== Social inequality ====
The online community is subject to social inequality such as gender inequality or racial and ethnic inequality, where the majority is overrepresented in the online community, and those of different background and genders are underrepresented.

== Legal issues ==
In the US, two of the most important laws dealing with legal issues of online communities, especially social networking sites are Section 512c of the Digital Millennium Copyright Act and Section 230 of the Communications Decency Act.

Section 512c removes liability for copyright infringement from sites that let users post content, so long as there is a way by which the copyright owner can request the removal of infringing content. The website may not receive any financial benefit from the infringing activities.

Section 230 of the Communications Decency Act gives protection from any liability as a result from the publication provided by another party. Common issues include defamation, but many courts have expanded it to include other claims as well.

Online communities of various kinds (social networking sites, blogs, media sharing sites, etc.) are posing new challenges for all levels of law enforcement, causing many obstacles when trying to follow crime. For example, harassment, identity theft, copyright infringement, and other crimes become much more difficult to trace back to the criminal.

Copyright law is being challenged and debated with the shift in how individuals now disseminate their intellectual property. Individuals come together via online communities in collaborative efforts to create. Many describe current copyright law as being ill-equipped to manage the interests of individuals or groups involved in these collaborative efforts. Some say that these laws may even discourage this kind of production.

Laws governing online behavior pose another challenge to lawmakers in that they must work to enact laws that protect the public without infringing upon their rights to free speech. Perhaps the most talked about issue of this sort is that of cyberbullying. Some scholars call for collaborative efforts between parents, schools, lawmakers, and law enforcement to curtail cyberbullying.

Laws must continually adapt to the ever-changing landscape of social media in all its forms; some legal scholars contend that lawmakers need to take an interdisciplinary approach to creating effective policy whether it is regulatory, for public safety, or otherwise. Experts in the social sciences can shed light on new trends that emerge in the usage of social media by different segments of society (including youths). Armed with this data, lawmakers can write and pass legislation that protect and empower various online community members.

== Online Communities during SARS CoV 2 (COVID-19) Pandemic ==
When the ongoing Severe Acute Respiratory Coronavirus 2 (SARS CoV 2) otherwise known as COVID-19, pandemic began, online communities and digital space became increasingly important. Since the World Health Organization, other public health agencies, and governments mandated contagion efforts like social distancing and isolation, people needed information and ways to connect with each other. The waves of COVID-19 and the associated dangers and containment measures of the airborne disease led to increased feelings of anxiety, fear, stress, and loneliness. With stay-at-home orders and social distancing measures in place, those with access to social media and digital space were able to find community online. Access to technology is crucial for social interaction and relationship-building.

Online communities during the ongoing COVID-19 pandemic use digital space for three main reasons:

- Education: with schools and universities closed across the globe, most curriculum shifted online.
- Health: with healthcare facilities tending to the global health crisis, many practices use online appointments and meetings.
- Connection: social distancing and isolation containment measures led to people finding community and support online.

Education

Access to digital technology at the beginning of the pandemic became important when students, teachers, and scholars, many of whom had in-person meetings previously, were required to start social distancing or isolate. In order to continue with the education curricula and research plans, those with access to digital devices, used technology to connect to the internet. By using Zoom and other virtual platforms educators, students, and scholars alike were able to maintain social distancing while creating connections to learn about themselves and the world around them. Cairns et al. found in their virtual ethnography that students rely on online technologies to stay connected for school and social engagement activities. Students use a wide variety of technologies including ones for education, entertainment, daily tasks, and social networks and were either synchronous or asynchronous. Online communities are essential for maintaining social connection and educational endeavors.

Health

The ongoing COVID-19 pandemic has led to an increased need for online communities and digital space for those who have preexisting medical conditions or those with post-acute sequelae or long-term health conditions after a SARS CoV 2 infection (Long COVID). Those people who are immunocompromised, disabled, elderly, or have health conditions like cancer, rely on online communities for information, solidarity, and support. Many of them depend on telehealth and social media in order to access healthcare and have connection in a socially-distant reality.

People with these illnesses that place them at risk, have feelings of frustration with the medical and political systems, despair, and grief that are shared within the online health communities. For example, in their article, "Experiences of people affected by cancer during the outbreak of the COVID-19 pandemic: an exploratory qualitative analysis of public online forums," Colomer-Lahiguera et al. found that cancer survivors and people with cancer had specific concerns with healthcare, infection, logistical and safety measures, and economic impacts that come with job loss and financial burdens. Those with cancer faced challenges in adapting to the "New normal," social behavioral change, and experiencing cancer. People with cancer also had different needs for advice that were either COVID-related in terms of risk, COVID-19 information, others' experiences, and measures to take if infected, or Cancer-related such as treatment, managing symptoms and side effects, and suspecting cancer. Online health communities allow for those with heightened fears of infection or reinfection to have the ability to discuss adaptation challenges and strategies to avoid COVID-19. People with cancer and Long COVID are faced with similar challenges in how they access healthcare, how healthcare providers treat them, and how they manage their illness or disease. Online communities offer people with health conditions ways to support each other, learn preventative measures to avoid COVID-19 infections and reinfections, and find shared interests and symptoms.

Connection

Whether they use online communities to connect for educational and research purposes or join to find solidarity or worship, people use the internet to create and foster relationships with others during the ongoing COVID-19 pandemic. In the U.K., Bryson et al. found that virtual faith communities which had online services often created an intrasacred spaces where together physical sacred spaces and rituals with secular become linked together. Congregation members became more active in the faith rituals and preparations than before the pandemic began and the use of social media became an important facilitator of connection. As social creatures, humans crave interaction with one another and people who are social distancing in an effort to avoid COVID-19 infections and reinfections use online communities to find ways of connection.

== See also ==
- Clan (computer gaming)
- Commons-based peer production
- Digital altruism
- Immersion (virtual reality)
- Internet activism
- Internet influences on communities
- Internet trolling
- Learner generated context
- Mass collaboration
- Network of practice
- Online community manager
- Online deliberation
- Online ethnography
- Online research community
- Professional network service
- Social media
- Social web
- Support groups
- Tribe (internet)
- Video game culture
