= Alen Ilijic =

Serbian musical artist

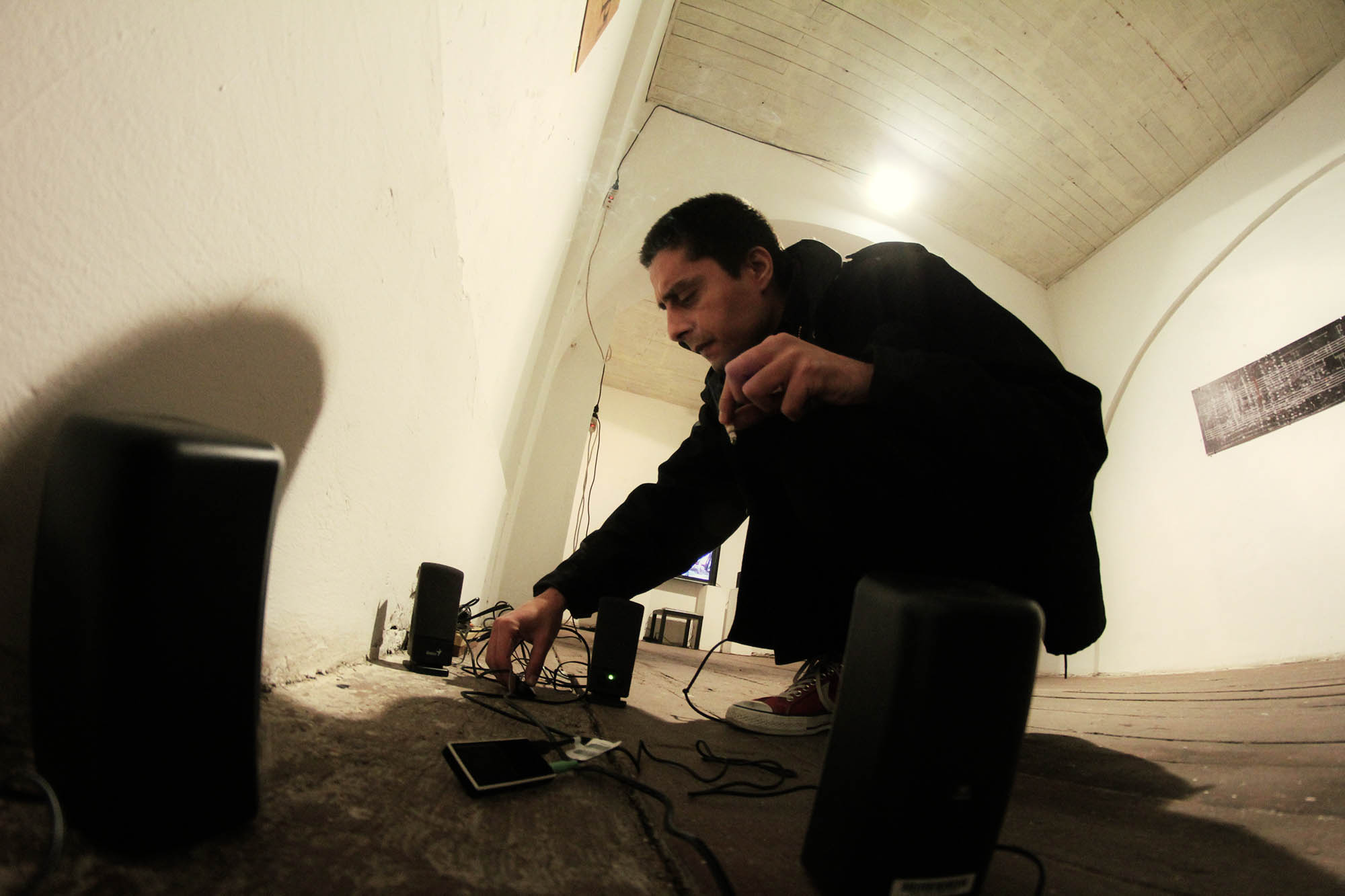

Background information
- Born: 30 January 1975 (age 51); Gevgelija, SFR Yugoslavia
- Genres: Contemporary, new media avant-garde, experimental, classical, noise, electro-acoustic, electronic, sound installation, visual
- Occupations: Composer, performer and polymedia artist
- Instruments: Piano, guitar, percussion, vocals
- Years active: 1989–present
- Labels: BMI, Ninety and Nine Records

Alen Ilijic (Serbian Cyrillic: Ален Илијић), (born 30 January 1975 in Gevgelija, SFR Yugoslavia), is a Serbian new media avant-garde composer and polymedia artist. He studied film music with Professor Amit Sen at City of Westminster College in London, and composition, orchestration, electronic music, and sound engineering at the Faculty of Music in Belgrade, with one of the most well-known composers, music theorists and modern music scholars in Eastern Europe, Srđan Hofman.

== Career ==
During his studies in London as a singer-songwriter and guitarist, Alen Ilijic formed the band Zealot, in 1993. At the time, his musical expression was in the form of experimental rock, noise, and Byzantine music. Zealot performed at Rock Garden, Hope and Anchor, Islington, Red Eye, Mean Fiddler, etc. With its innovative sound, Zealot had a big impact on the British underground scene during the nineties. The band stopped performing in 1999, due to Alen's return to Yugoslavia, Serbia. From this point onward, Alen Ilijic's interest was in the avant-garde movement, under the influence of Béla Bartók, John Cage, Marcel Duchamp, and Serbian polymedia artist and composer Vladan Radovanović.

His album I have no coordiNATION was released in May 2014, for the New York-based label 'Ninety and Nine Records'. The album contains eight compositions that were created between 1999 and 2013 in London and Belgrade. Besides three compositions that were performed live (Improvisation for piano, violin and amplifier, at Student Cultural Center Belgrade, 2010, My suspicious look at the Yugoslav Drama Theatre, Belgrade, 2008, and I have no coordiNATION, at Belgrade Philharmonic Orchestra Hall, 2007), others were recorded and realized in Ilijic's home studio. My suspicious look is an aleatoric composition performed by Ilijic and Jean Geoffroy, produced by the Italian composer Michelangelo Lupone. I have no coordiNATION was performed by pianist Neda Hofman and recorded by Srđan Hofman. As a retrospective, the album displays the diversity of Ilijic's creative work.

The Composition for piano, voice and body movement called Red Faces was premiered at the international music festival 'Stone upon Stone’ which was held in the Symphony Orchestra Hall, 17 April 2015, Niš, Serbia. The Red Faces is a homage to Gertrude Stein as a reminder of the terrible past, wars and Holocaust in order to emphasize the similarity to current wars crimes and sufferings. During the same year, Ilijic has performed this composition at the 'Noise Mobility Festival’, Munich, Germany, on 23 May. Another part of the performance included the use of guitar, voice and electronics. Furthermore, in 2016, Ilijic has performed Red Faces in Tel Aviv, Israel at Hateiva, as part of the festival The Unbearable Lightness of Coherency, on 30 January. On that occasion Ilijic collaborated with Dganit Elyakim, playing together with her composition for piano and voice, 'Failing Better'. During his visit to Israel, he also performed with one of the greatest Israeli vocal artists, Anat Pick, and with Nadav Masel bassist and improviser, at Zimmer, in Tel Aviv. His performance of the Red Faces was held at 'Interpenetration’, Club Wakuum, Graz, Austria, on 17 March 2016.

In October 2016, Alen Ilijic went to the United States. He performed in the Bratton Recital Hall, at The University of New Hampshire, Paul Creative Arts College (PCAC), on 20 October, and at Portsmouth Music and Arts Center (PMAC), New Hampshire, on 21 October. On both occasions, he performed the composition Red Faces but also a part with the use of guitar, voice and electronics, called Zealot's time. Before these performances, Ilijic held a lecture to students about his way of composing at The University of New Hampshire, Department of Music, on 18 October. This is the second time Ilijic held this kind of lecture, the first time was in Vienna, at Universität für Musik und darstellende Kunst Wien, on 13 April 2016. The interview about Ilijic's visit to USA was published for The New Hampshire's 18th issue of the 2016–17 academic year. Also, Russ Grazier, Jr. (co-founder of PMAC, Portsmouth, executive director, saxophone, composition, music theory and ensembles) has interviewed Alen Ilijić, and it's available at the PMAC's podcast.

In 2017 Ilijic's composition for piano and voice Ongevarfen/Disordered was premiered at Mandagsclubben, in Copenhagen, Denmark, on March, 27. Ongevarfen/Disordered is a composition dedicated to all the victims of NATO bombing of Yugoslavia. Ilijic's intention of playing it was marking a commemoration of the bombing that began 18 years ago, on 24 March 1999. On 18 May 2017, Ilijic has performed at Echoraum, 1+1=15,3 Ι Piano Soli festival in Vienna, Austria. During this occasion, he has performed the composition Red Faces by request of an Austrian composer-performer and festival director, Katharina Klement. The festival is supported by International Society for Contemporary Music, ISCM. On 5 August, Ilijic has performed at NO NOISE festival, Sonoscopia, in Porto, Portugal.

In 2018, on February 25 and 26, Ilijic has performed at Zimmer, in Jaffa, Tel Aviv, Israel. On both occasions, he performed compositions for piano and voice called A Broken piano and for guitar, voice and electronics. These compositions are dedicated to all the victims of a Nazi concentration and extermination camp called Semlin during World War II, located in Belgrade, at the time in the Independent State of Croatia (NDH). Also at Zimmer Ilijic held a lecture about his way of composing. On 1 July, Ilijic has performed at Kunsthaltestelle Streckhammerhaus, Frohnleiten, Austria. In the same gallery his painting The Eternal Chess was exhibited from 1 July until 31 July 2018. On 28 September, Alen Ilijic has performed at Mazkeka, in Jerusalem, Israel.

In 2019 Ilijic performed in Athens, Greece, at Chimeres on 6 April. The composition for piano and voice called Overtake was premiered at KSET, ZEZ festival in Zagreb, Croatia, on 10 April. During this occasion, Ilijic also had an exhibition conceived with the paintings on paper which are, in the form of visual scores, deeply connected with music and his compositions. On 4 May, Ilijic performed at aNOther festival, Vienna, Austria and had a solo exhibition. Also, Alen Ilijic performed his compositions for piano and guitar named R V Human Trash? at Apo-33 in Nantes, France, on 15 November.

In 2020, due to the COVID-19 pandemic, Ilijic's entire musical and artistic engagement was online. His four paintings and composition Let's Rave in a F grave were part of the digital visual art exhibition Breathing While Black as a response to the ongoing slaughter of Black Americans: the police murders of George Floyd and Ahmaud Arbery, and the killing of Breonna Taylor in her own home. The exhibition was organized by Augusta Savage Gallery, at the University of Massachusetts Amherst, United States, and it was held from 1 September until 20 November 2020. Another Ilijic's four paintings as well as the composition Disturbing a Cycle were presented online at the festival Cross Cities 2020, located in Sant'Agata de' Goti, Italy, from 9 September. In Taiwan, his video performance named Improvisation for piano - Zone 2 was played at One More Festival - Border Lines on 12 December. Ilijic's new EP Classified was premiered at TEIA - programa de rádio, in Portugal, on 12 December. Ilijic's self-released EP Classified was published online, on 18 December. Dave Foxall, (former writer for Jazz Journal UK, and editor of a Jazz Noise, wrote about the Classified in his review: 'The brevity works. Short, intense, not a moment wasted – carving your attention into new shapes. Each momentary fraction leaves you grasping for more... even if ‘more’ could easily be surfeit.' Two compositions Classified and Disturbing a Circle from the EP were played on radio station CandoFM, UK, at Space is the Place Radio Show, in Barrow-in-Furness, Cumbria, North-West England. Since 27 May, Alen Ilijic started with his own digital exhibitions on his website. These exhibitions are curated by art historian and his wife Milica Ilijic.

Rob Haskins, (D.M.A., PhD Professor and Chair, Department of Music, College of Liberal Arts University of New Hampshire) has analyzed his music: ‘lijic’s music is guided by an unerring intuition, revealing unexpected connections among the wide variety of utterances that mark the extraordinary richness of the total musical world available today. But, like Arnold Schoenberg, Ilijic has forged from the materials around him a new and consistent world entirely his own.’

== Exhibitions ==
As a polymedia artist Alen Ilijic has had three solo exhibitions in Belgrade: Stellar Refugee (2011), NOISYGENES (2014), and Zone 2 (2017). The Stellar Refugee contains prints of manual drawings, sound installation and a documentary film, dedicated to Gustav Mahler. NOISYGENES is a project conceived with neo-expressionist paintings, symbolic prints and performance, as a way to examine the concept of noise. Neo-expressionist paintings carry an echo of Jean-Michel Basquiat's voice, which is present in Alen's gesture and use of words. An inseparable part of the exhibition was homonymous performance – improvisation for electric guitar and electronics. The projects Stellar Refugee and NOISYGENES were supported by the Serbian Ministry of Culture and Information.

His triptych Cyclic was exhibited at the group exhibition called I Breathe With You at the University of Massachusetts Amherst, United States, Augusta Savage Gallery, from 1 February until 11 March 2016. The exclamation 'I can't breathe' was made by Eric Garner, an African American man, 11 times while lying face down on the sidewalk after being placed in a police chokehold. He died one hour later from a heart attack due to injuries to his neck and chest. A grand jury decided not to indict the offending police officer. 'I can't breathe' has become one of the most recognizable utterances of recent protests against oppression. I Breathe With You establishes the artist as an ally to people and communities that suffer social injustices and other atrocities.

A third solo exhibition I am movable Jasenovac was curated by art historian Milica Ilijic, and held at 'KC Ribnica' Kraljevo, Serbia, in September 2015. The exhibition is based on the theme of the largest concentration camp in the Independent State of Croatia where Serbs, Jews and Roma were killed during World War II (1941–1945). It is focused on personal research, genetic affiliation (and thus racism), anti-Semitism and discrimination, current and past. The commemoration of the Jasenovac’s victims and emphasizing discrimination, specifically Serbs, is in connection with the recent political turmoil in the European Parliament and adoption of the Resolution of Srebrenica. The project I am movable Jasenovac reveals the absurdity of negative stereotypes about the Roma, Serbs and Jews, which persist in contemporary society. Going back to the past, to illuminate his own origin, Alen Ilijic has also made a step towards the future: towards equality, justice and dignity.

The project New Media Opera ONGEVARFEN (DISORDERED) started in Graz, Austria, in February 2016, and it is dedicated to one of the most influential Austrian composers and painters of the 20th century, Arnold Schoenberg. The new media opera consists of three main parts: artworks; a composition for piano, voice and electronics; and a video installation. These three approaches to expression coexist as interactive parts among each other, especially with the live performance of the artist. As inseparable and equal parts with respect to importance, they form a unit showing Ilijic's great polymedia talent.

Zone 2 is the fourth solo, polymedia exhibition by Alen Ilijic, conceived with paintings, prints, ready-mades, video projection and spectral composition which is created for the gallery space. During the closing of the exhibition Alen Ilijic has performed three works: two compositions for piano, voice and electronics named Red Faces and Ongevarfen (Disordered)’, as well as a piece for guitar, voice and electronics named Zealot’s time. The exhibition was curated by art historian Milica Ilijic, and held at the Gallery ŠTAB, Belgrade, Serbia, on 14 January 2017. The project Zone 2 has multiple meanings: it refers to the smaller part of the city where the artist lives, experiencing it in a function of narrow, isolated space, or a detention facility. Such alienation is caused by the ingrained societal rejection of liberal visions and innovative ideas expressed in music and art. Thus, Zone 2 indicates parts of any country in which, de facto through the centuries, geniuses have carried the burden of radical movements. The focus is on the mental process of creating, a constant need for documenting new ideas, emphasizing the importance of the phenomenon of creativity. The project is also in the context of marking a ‘liberated’ space for understanding the opposed ideas and places for the realization of innovative approaches. Zone 2 shows the attitude of the artist in relation to the wrong perception of the viewer, as a result of the increasing commercialization of art with surface qualities of form. The project brings an atypical model of the artist's behavior: negative reactions are not in the service of questioning the ideas’ initiatives; on the contrary, they are in a function of additional incentives, as well as an ‘evidence’ of shifting borders of contemporary standards.

== Online releases ==
Ilijic's self-released EP 'Classified' was published at Bandcamp platform on 18 December 2020. Album 'I have No CoordiNATION', Ninety and Nine Records, 2014. Composition '23 Sec. Violin Duo' was published in the compilation called '23 Seconds of Time: Volume 11'. For an album An Appreciation, The Music of Ancient Greece, Ilijic has released the composition ‘Τράβα ρε αλάνη ‘.The ‘Buddhist On Fire’ label compilation, ‘Cantabile’, has released his composition 'U Can't Control Me (For Violin And A Computer Generated Voice, 2015)'. The cover art for the compilation uses Ilijic's artwork. Black Planet Records has published the composition ‘My Suspicious Look’ on ‘Balkan Under The Radar Vol. 2: The Black Wave’
