= Heather Horst =

American anthropologist

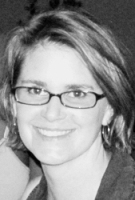
Heather Horst

Heather A. Horst FAHA is a social anthropologist and media studies academic and author who writes on material culture, mobility, and the mediation of social relations. In 2020 she became the Director of the Institute for Culture and Society at Western Sydney University where she is a Professor and is also a lead investigator in the ARC Centre of Excellence for Automated Decision-Making and Society. Prior to this she was a professor of Media and Communications at the University of Sydney from 2017 and Vice Chancellor's Senior Research Fellow in the School of Media and Communication at RMIT University in Melbourne, Australia from 2011. She has also been a Research Fellow in the MA program in digital anthropology at University College London.

== Career ==
Horst earned her degrees in anthropology, receiving a B.A. (1996) from the University of Minnesota, an M.A. (1999) from the University of California, Santa Barbara, and a Ph.D. (2004) from University College, London (UCL). Horst served as an Associate Project Scientist for DML Research Hub in the Department of Humanities Research Institute at University of California, Irvine, an Honorary Research Associate in Department of Anthropology and a faculty of Social & Historical Sciences at University College London.

Horst's research focuses upon the relationship between place, space and new media. Her research has been published in a range of journals, including Social Anthropology, Current Anthropology, Journal of Material Culture, Global Networks, Identities, International Journal of Communication and the Caribbean Review of Gender Studies. She has been a guest editor for special issues of the International Journal of Communication, Journal of Material Culture, International Journal of Cultural Studies and Home Cultures. She is also the co-author of The Cell Phone: An Anthropology of Communication (Horst and Miller, Berg, 2006) and Hanging Out, Messing Around and Geeking Out: Kids Living and Learning with Digital Media (MIT Press, 2009, Ito, et al.).

Horst was elected a Fellow of the Australian Academy of the Humanities in 2023.

== Research ==
Heather Horst's research focuses on the relationship between material culture and the role of objects and artifacts in mediating social relations, with particular attention to mobility and the global movement of people, objects, goods, media and capital in different national and transnational spaces. In particular, she is known for her research in digital media, and is conducting research on fashion and music.

The Materiality of Personhood

The idea of starting this research came from Heather horst's 'dissertation worked in Mandeville, Jamaica, which explored the imagination, construction and transformation of the meanings of ‘home’ among Jamaicans who migrated to Britain after World War II and returned to Jamaica to retire in the 1990s.' In this research, Heather Horst works on the relationship between material culture, property and personhood by understanding the materiality of the house assert, recognize and negotiate personhood in colonial and postcolonial Jamaica.

New Media, Technology and Society

In order to examine the relationship between new media in this research, Heather Horst began to study on the 'global and transnational processes involved in the construction of the ‘digital divide’ as part of a multi-national comparative study funded by the British Department for International Development (DFID) to examine the implications of new information and communication technologies in Ghana, India, Jamaica and South Africa working with Daniel Miller.' Also, over the past four years, Horst's study focuses on 'social change and the power dynamics surrounding the provisioning, access to and use of new media and technology by shifting my attention to the heart of the global technology industry.'
