= Tribe (internet) =

Slang for an unofficial community of people who share a common interest

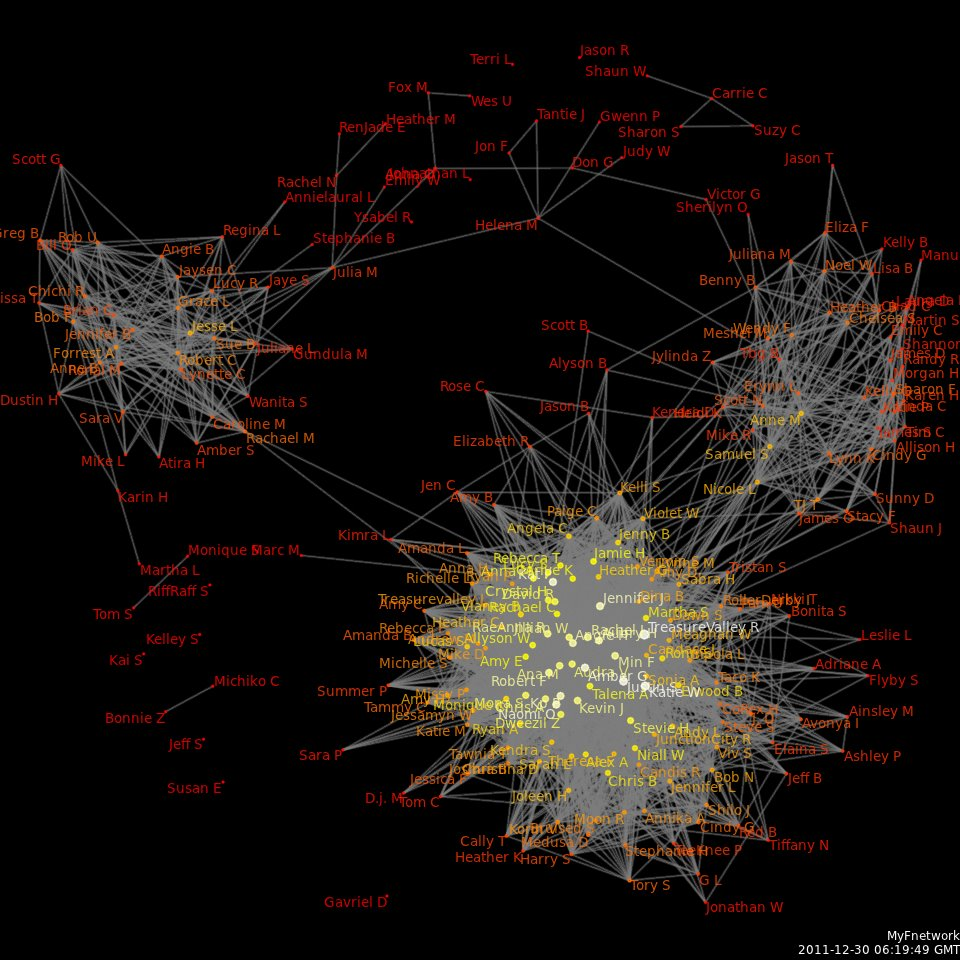
A social network diagram displaying tribes clustered by friendship ties among a set of Facebook users

An internet tribe or digital tribe is an unofficial online community or organization of people who share a common interest, and who are usually loosely affiliated with each other through social media or other Internet routes. The term is related to "tribe", which traditionally refers to people closely associated in both geography and genealogy. Nowadays, it is more like a virtual community or a personal network and it is often called global digital tribe. Most anthropologists agree that a tribe is a (small) society that practices its own customs and culture, and that these define the tribe. The tribes are divided into clans, with their own customs and cultural values that differentiate them from activities that occur in 'real life' contexts. People feel more inclined to share and defend their ideas on social networks than they would face to face.

== Precedents ==
The term "tribe" originated around the time of the Greek city-states and the early formation of the Roman Empire. The Latin term "tribus" has since been transformed to mean "A group of persons forming a community and claiming descent from a common ancestor" As years passed by, the range of meanings have grown greater, for example, "Any of various systems of social organization comprising several local villages, bands, districts, lineages, or other groups and sharing a common ancestry, language, culture, and name" (Morris, 1980, p. 1369). Morris (1980) also notes that a tribe is a "group of persons with a common occupation, interest, or habit," and "a large family." Vestiges of ancient tribe communities were preserved in both large gatherings (like football matches) and in small ones (like church communities). Even though nowadays the range of groups referred to as tribal is truly enormous, it was not until the industrial society eroded the tribal gatherings of more primitive societies and redefined community. However, the existence of social media as we know it today is due to the post-industrial society that has seen the rapid growth of personal computers, mobile phones and the Internet. People now can collaborate, communicate, celebrate, commemorate, give their advice and share their ideas around these virtual clans that have once again redefined the social behaviour.

That internet tribes exist, is an expression of the existence of a human tribal instinct.

== History ==
The first attempt of such social communities dates back to at least 2003, when tribe.net was launched.

== Tribes from a technical perspective ==
Not only do Twitter tribes have mutual interests, but they also share potentially subconscious language features as found in the 2013 study by researchers from Royal Holloway University of London and Princeton. Dr. John Bryden from the School of Biological Sciences at Royal Holloway states that it is possible to anticipate which community somebody is likely to belong to, with up to 80 percent accuracy. This research shows that people try to join societies based on the same interests and hobbies. In order to achieve this, publicly available messages were sent via Twitter to record conversations between two or more participants. As a result, each community can be characterised by their most used words. This approach can enrich new communities detection based on word analysis in order to automatically classify people inside social networks. The methods of identification of tribes relied heavily on algorithms and techniques from statistical physics, computational biology and network science.

A different approach is taken by Tribefinder. The system is able to identify tribal affiliations of Twitter users using deep learning and machine learning. The system establishes to which tribes individuals belong through the analysis of their tweets and the comparison of their vocabulary. These tribal vocabularies are previously generated based on the vocabulary of tribal influencers and leaders using keywords expressing concepts, ideas and beliefs.

The final step to make the system learn on how to associate random individuals with specific tribes consists of the analysis of the language these influential tribal leaders use through deep learning. In so doing, classifiers are created using embedding and LSTM (long short-term memory) models. Specifically, these classifiers work by collecting the Twitter feeds of all the users from the tribes that Tribefinder is training on. On these, embedding is applied to map words into vectors, which are then used as input for the following LSTM models. Tribefinder analyzes the individual's word usage in their tweets and then assigns the corresponding alternative realities, lifestyle, and recreation tribal affiliation based on the similarities with the specific tribal vocabularies.

== An in-depth look into the research ==
The research had four main stages on which it focused: background, results, conclusions and methods.

=== Background ===
The language is a system of communication consisting of sounds, words, and grammar, or the system of communication used by people in a particular country or type of work. Language is perhaps the most important characteristic that distinguishes human beings from other animals. In addition, it has a wide range of social implications that can be associated with social or cultural groups. People usually group in communities with the same interests. This will result in a variation of the words they use because of the differentiation of terms from each domain. Therefore, the hypothesis of this study would be that this variation should closely match the community structure of the network. To test this theory, around 250,000 users from the social networking and microblogging site Twitter were monitored in order to analyse whether the groups identified had the same language features or not. As Twitter uses unstructured data and users can send messages to any other users, the study had to be based on complex algorithms. These algorithms had to determine the word frequency inside messages between people and make a link to the groups they usually visited.

=== Results and discussion ===
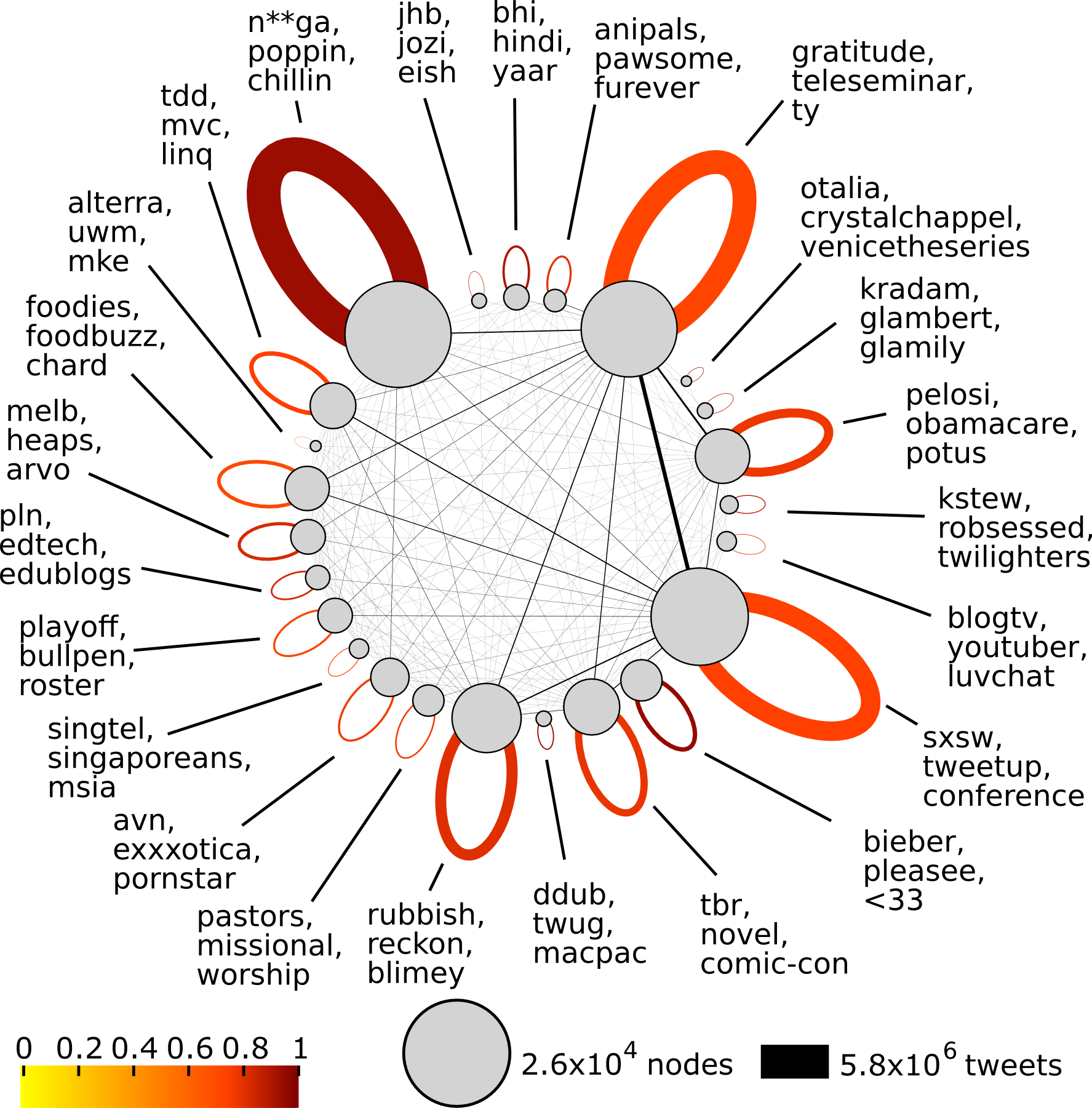
Communication between and within tribes of Twitter users clustered based on word usage. Tribes tend to communicate more within than between themselves.

The problem of detecting the community features is one of the main issues in the study of networking systems. Social networks naturally tend to divide themselves into communities or modules. However, some world networks are too big so they must be simplified before information can be extracted. As a result, an effective way of dealing with this drawback for smaller communities is by using modularity algorithms in order to partition users into even smaller groups. For larger ones, a more efficient algorithm called 'map equation' decomposes a network into modules by optimally compressing a description of information flows on the network. Each community was therefore characterised according to the words they used the most, based on a ranking algorithm. To determine the significance of word usage differences, word endings and word lengths were also measured and showed that the pattern found was the correct one. Moreover, these studies also helped in predicting community membership of users, by comparing their own word frequencies with community word usage. This helped in forecasting which community a certain user is going to access based on the words that they are using.

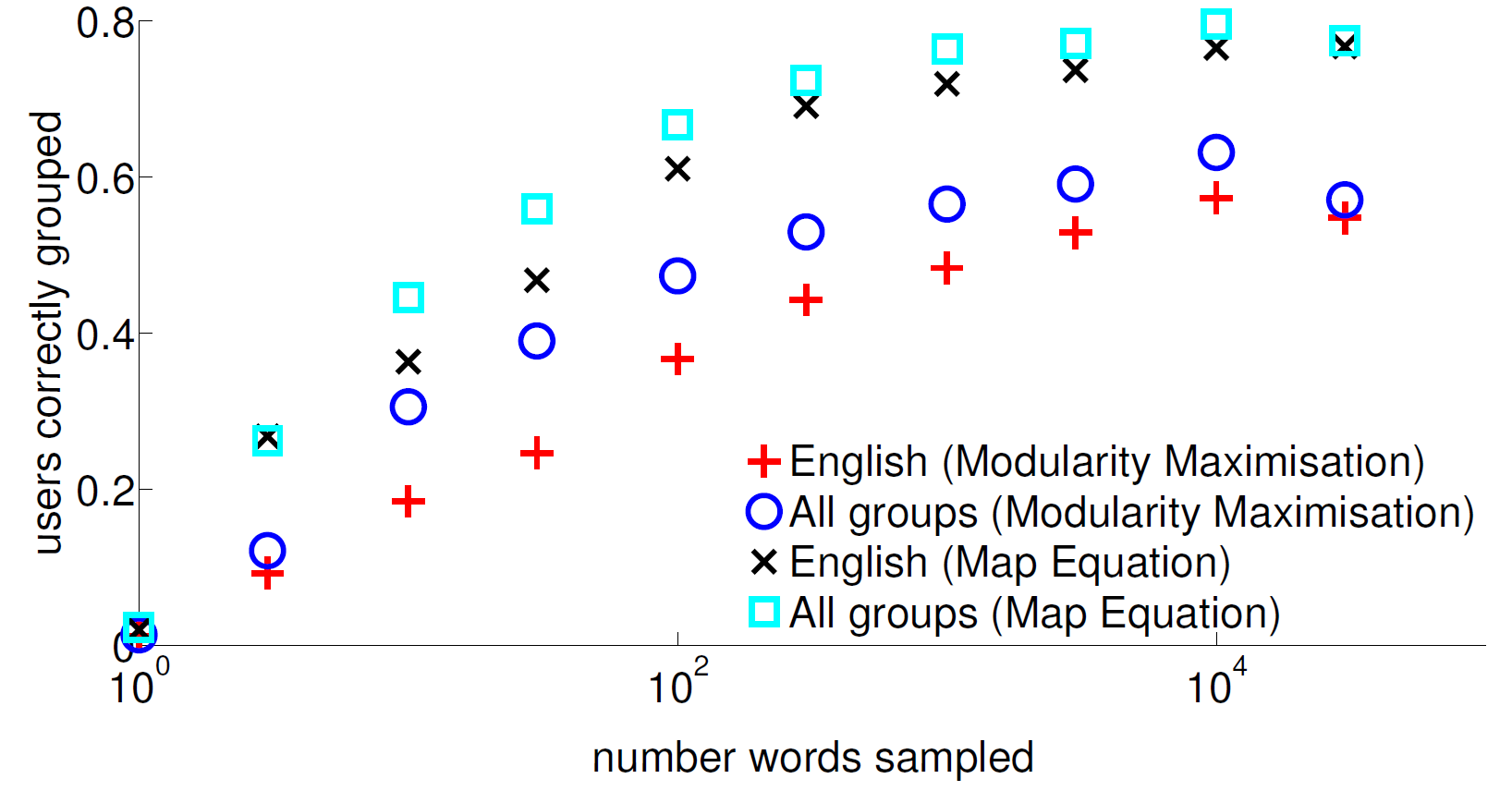
The proportion of users whose topological community association is correctly predicted by the study.

=== Conclusions ===
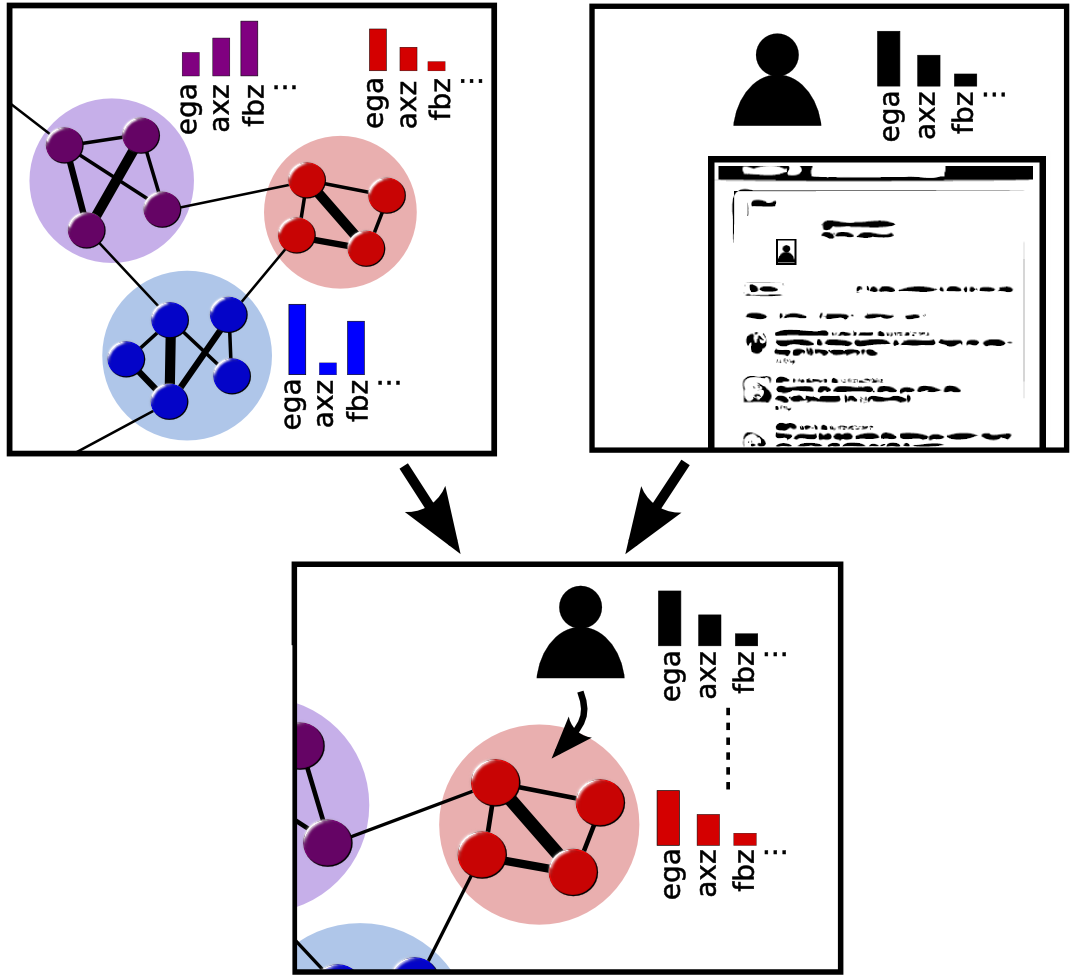
An illustration of the method for predicting which community a user is embedded in.

The aim of this research was to study the bond between community structure in a social network environment and language use within the community . The striking pattern that was found suggests that people from different clans tend to use different words based on their own interests and hobbies. Even though this approach did not manage to cover all people inside Twitter, it has several advantages over ordinary surveys that cover a smaller scale of groups: it is systematic, it is non-intrusive and it easily produces large volumes of rich data. Moreover, other cultural characteristics can be found out when extending this study. For example, whether individuals that belong to multiple communities use different word sets in each of them.

=== Methods ===
A process called snowball-sampling helped forming the sample network. Each user's tweets and messages were recorded and any new users referenced were added to a list from where they were picked to be sampled. Messages that were copies have been ignored. In order to find out the words that characterise each clan, the fraction of people that use a certain word was compared with the fraction of people that use that word globally. The difference between communities has also been measured by comparing the relative word usage frequency.

== Different spellings within tribes ==
Words, and the way we spell them are in a continuous change, as we find new ways to communicate. Despite the fact that traditional dictionaries do not take into account the changes, online ones have adopted many of them. An interesting fact outlined in the research above is that communities tend to use their own distinctive spelling for words. According to Professor Vincent Jansen from Royal Holloway online communities spell words in different ways, just as people have different regional accents. For example, Justin Bieber fans tend to end words in "ee" as in "pleasee", while school teachers tend to use long words. Moreover, the largest group found in the study was composed of African Americans who were using the words "nigga", "poppin", and "chillin". Members of this community also tend to shorten the ends of the words, replacing "ing" with "in" and "er" with "a".

== The campfire ==
Each tribe has an online-platform (such as Flickr or Tumblr), called campfire around which they gather. These campfires tend to enable one or more of the following three tribal activities:

- Cooperation (e.g. Wikipedia)
- Communication (e.g. Social networks)
- Cognition (e.g. Blogs)

However, some brands are building their own tribes around platforms outside of these.

== Cooperation ==
Cooperation is the action of working together to the same end. Cooperation developed naturally over time, as it helped companies to streamline their research costs and to better answer to users' requirements. As a result, nowadays organisations are looking for flexible structures that can easily adapt to this rapidly changing environment. Groupware systems perfectly cater to these needs of companies. Informal communication predominates and specialists in certain domains exchange their experience with other people within the groupware environment. Collaboration and cooperation are available through instant messages; people can discuss, chat and swap ideas. Moreover, people can work together while they are located remotely from each other. Groupware can be split into three categories: communication, collaboration and coordination, depending on the level of cooperation and technology involved in the process. One of the biggest and well-known cooperation software is Wikipedia.

The logo of Wikipedia

=== Wikipedia ===
Wikipedia is a collaborative software because anyone can edit it. Any user can edit articles, view past revisions and discuss through a forum the current state of each article. Due to the fact that anyone can change it and find information very quickly, it has become one of the 10 most accessed sites on the Internet.

==== Advantages ====
Wikipedia has many advantages over other encyclopedias:

- It is free and open for anyone on the Internet;
- All past edits and chats from the forum are public and everyone can see them;
- Updates happen frequently;
- It contains millions of articles;
- Easy to use and learn;

==== Disadvantages ====
However, there are also some drawbacks:

- Information can be inaccurate;
- It is open to spam and vandalism;
- Some articles can contain omissions and be hard to understand;
- It can be too open sometimes (for confidential documentation);
- It requires Internet connectivity.
- It has a bias as most moderators and users are young, male and American.

== Communication ==
Communication is the act or an instance of communicating; the imparting or exchange of information, ideas, or feelings. Communication has drastically changed over time and social networks have changed the way people communicate. Even though people]can interact with each other 24/7, there is a new wave of barriers and threats. In the workplace environment, electronic Communication has overtaken face-to-face and voice-to-voice Communication by far. This major shift has been done in advantage of Generation Y, who prefer instant messaging than talking directly to someone. It is often said that it could become an ironic twist, but social media has the real potential of making us less social. However, there are studies that confirm that people are becoming more social, but the style in which they interact with each other has changed a lot. One of the major drawbacks of social networks is privacy, as people tend to trust others more rapidly and send more open messages about themselves. As a result, personal information can be easily exposed to other persons. Twitter and Facebook are two of the biggest social networks in the world.

=== Facebook ===
Facebook is currently the largest social network in the world with more than 1 billion people using this website. This actually means that approximately one in seven people on Earth use Facebook. Facebook users share their stories, images and videos in order to celebrate and commemorate events together. They can also play social games and like other Facebook pages. Moreover, there is also a section called 'News Feed' where users can see social information from their friends or from the pages that they liked or shared. Each user has their own profile page that is called 'wall', where they can post all the above-mentioned materials (their friends can do this as well). The biggest advantage of Facebook is that you can make new friends, as well as find old acquaintances and restart socialising with them. One of the most useful feature of Facebook is the existence of groups. Users with the same interests can create a new group or take part in already existing ones to debate information and exchange their ideas. However, there are also groups that are created to declare an affiliation, such as an obsession for different subjects.

=== Twitter ===
Twitter is another social network that allows users to send and read short messages called 'tweets'. Even though messages can contain only 280 characters, this is the perfect length for sending status updates to followers. The main advantage of Twitter is that people can gain followers quickly and share ideas and links very fast. There are networks of influential people who can be connected via Twitter. On Twitter, tribes manifest themselves as followers of either a person, a company or an institution. As a result, it can be used as a marketing tool to make someone's product visible, on condition that a big tribe of followers is created. In order to do this, the right community must be built, as finding the right people can be a challenge. There are some steps that users could take into account in order to make connections and therefore make people follow them: search using Twitter search, follow the followers of other users, look at Twitter Lists, use #Hashtags and find third-party programs.

== Conclusion ==
As Seth Godin states, "The Internet eliminated geography". People join tribes or clans because they find and share the same ideas and interests with other people. The main disadvantage of old tribes is that they could not influence group behaviour. On the other hand, new tribes are self-sustaining and can survive without a leader, they are not necessarily dialogue based and they are long lasting. As it has been demonstrated within this article, tribes have influenced the way languages, organisations and cultures work. They have redefined old concepts with the help of social media and have changed the way people will interact in the future.

== See also ==
- Digital anthropology
- Digital sociology
- Geek culture
- Social network
- Social networking
- Social Web
- Sociology of the Internet
- Splinternet
