= Djalan Sampoerna =

Early 1900s manuscript by Soetjipto

Djalan Sampoerna is a Malay autobiographical manuscript written by Soetjipto, a homosexual Javanese priyayi that is written between 1919 and 1927 in East Java, Dutch East Indies. In this manuscript, Soetjipto recounts his life as a homosexual man. This manuscript is considered the first homosexual autobiographical manuscript in the Indonesia.

== History ==
The autobiographic manuscript was first discovered in the mid-1970s by Ulrich Kratz, a traditional Malay researcher at the National Library of Indonesia. The book was found in Malay Manuscripts category, based on the Indonesische Handschriften catalog which was compiled by Poerbatjaraka. The manuscript was a legacy of Hans Overbeck, a German researcher and publisher who had resided in Yogyakarta since 1920. Tom Boellstorff hypothesized that Hans may have been Soetjipto's lover, which would explain why Hans owned this book

The autobiography recounts the experience of Soetjipto as Javanese man living as a homosexual during the colonial era of Indonesia as Dutch East Indies. He recount his life especially about how he realize his homosexual identity, ran away from home and end up became male prostitute. In the biography, he also share his view about the categorization of men based on his sexuality into four types:

- men who like women,
- men who like men,
- men who have sex with men for money but actually like women, and
- men who like men and act like women

== Publication ==
The edited version by Amen Budiman titled Jalan hidupku autobiografi seorang gay priyayi Jawa awal abad XX was published by Penerbitan Apresiasi Gay Jakarta, but it did not last long in since it was quickly banned as immoral by the attorney general at that time. According to Benedict Anderson, Budiman made big changes to the text and left out many important things because he reduced the text from 406 pages to 201 pages and also left out translation of difficult passage. Then, the books republished by Mimbar in 2008.
