= Social web =

Social relations over the World Wide Web

External videos
- Where the Social Web Meets the Semantic Web, Tom Gruber

The social web is a set of social relations that link people through the World Wide Web. The social web encompasses how websites and software are designed and developed in order to support and foster social interaction. These online social interactions form the basis of much online activity including online shopping, education, gaming and social networking services. The social aspect of Web 2.0 communication has been to facilitate interaction between people with similar tastes. These tastes vary depending on who the target audience is, and what they are looking for. For individuals working in the public relation department, the job is consistently changing and the impact is coming from the social web. The influence held by the social network is large and ever changing.

As communication on the internet increases, information about social relationships becomes more available. Social Networks such as Facebook enable people and organizations to c. Today hundreds of millions of people are using social media to stay connected with their peers, discover new connections, and share photos, videos, bookmarks, and blogs. Social networks are available on smartphones. By the second quarter in 2017, Facebook reported 1.86 billion members, and, in 2008, MySpace occupied 100 million users and YouTube had more than 100 million videos and 2.9 million user channels, and these numbers are consistently growing. The social Web is undergoing a transformation, moving beyond simple web applications, that connects individuals to a new way of life.

== History ==
Like the telephone, the Internet was not created as a communication tool to interact socially, but evolved to become a part of everyday life. However, social interaction has been facilitated by the web for nearly the entire duration of its existence, as indicated by the continuing success of social software, which at its core centers around connecting individuals virtually with others whom they already have relationships with in the physical world. Email dates from the 1960s, and was one of the first social applications to connect multiple individuals through a network, enabling social interaction by allowing users to send messages to one or more people. This application, which some have argued may be the most successful social software ever, was actually used to help build the Internet. The web got its start as a large but simple Bulletin Board System (BBS) that allowed users to exchange software, information, news, data, and other messages with one another. Ward Christensen invented the first public BBS in the late 1970s, and another (named "The WELL") in the late 80s and early '90s arose as a popular online community. The Usenet, a global discussion system similar to a BBS that enabled users to post public messages, was conceived in 1979; the system found tremendous popularity in the 1980s as individuals posted news and articles to categories called "newsgroups". By the late 1990s, personal web sites that allowed individuals to share information about their private lives with others were increasingly widespread. On this fertile period of the web's development, its creator Sir Tim Berners-Lee wrote that:

The Web is more a social creation than a technical one. I designed it for a social effect—to help people work together—and not as a technical toy. The ultimate goal of the Web is to support and improve our weblike existence in the world. We clump into families, associations, and companies. We develop trust across the miles and distrust around the corner. What we believe, endorse, agree with, and depend on is representable and, increasingly, represented on the Web.

The term "social Web" was coined by Howard Rheingold for this network in 1996; Rheingold was quoted in an article for Time on his website "Electric Minds", described as a "virtual community center" that listed online communities for users interested in socializing through the Web, saying that "The idea is that we will lead the transformation of the Web into a social Web".

The social Web developed in three stages from the beginning of the '90s up to the present day, transforming from simple one-way communication web pages to a network of truly social applications. During the "one-way conversation" era of online applications in the mid '90s, most of the nearly 18,000 web pages in existence were "read only", or "static web sites" with information flowing exclusively from the person or organization that ran the site; although the web was used socially at this time, communication was difficult, achieved only through individuals reacting to each other's posts on one web page by responding to them on their own personal web page. In the mid '90s, Amazon and other pioneers made great progress in advancing online social interaction by discovering how to link databases to their web sites in order to store information as well as to display it; in concert with other innovations, this led to the rise of read-write web applications, allowing for a "two-way conversation" between users and the individual or organization running the site. As these web applications became more sophisticated, people became more comfortable using and interacting with them, bandwidth increased, and access to the Internet became more prevalent, causing designers to begin implementing new features that allowed users to communicate not only with a site's publishers, but with others who visited that site as well. Despite being a small step forward technologically, it was a huge step socially, enabling group interaction for the first time, and it has been claimed that this social exchange between many individuals is what separates a web application from a social Web application.

The first social networking services, including Classmates.com (1995) and SixDegrees.com (1997), were introduced prior to social media sites. It has been argued that the transition towards social media sites began after the world's first online interactive diary community Open Diary was founded on December 19, 1998; currently still online after ten years, it has hosted over five million digital diaries. Open Diary successfully brought online diary writers together into one community as an early social networking service, and it was during this time that the term "weblog" was coined (later to be shortened to the ubiquitous "blog" after one blogger jokingly turned weblog into the sentence "we blog"). Some claim that this marked the beginning of the current era of social media, with "social media" being a term that entered into both common usage and prominence as high-speed Internet became increasingly available, growing in popularity as a concept and leading to the rise of social networking services such as Myspace (2003) and Facebook (2004). It has been argued that this trend towards social media "can be seen as an evolution back to the Internet's roots, since it re-transforms the World Wide Web to what it was initially created for: a platform to facilitate information exchange between users."

== Evolution ==
The social web is a way of life: many people visit social networking services at least once per day, and in 2008 the average amount of time per visit to MySpace hovered around twenty-six minutes (the length of a sitcom). Furthermore, the astoundingly rapid growth of the social Web since the '90s is not projected to slow down anytime soon: with less than 20% of the world's population using the Internet, the social Web is felt by some to still be in its infancy. The line between social networking and social media is becoming increasingly blurred as sites such as Facebook and Twitter further incorporate photo, video, and other functionalities typical of social media sites into users' public profiles, just as social media sites have been integrating features characteristic of social networking services into their own online frameworks. One notable change that has been brought about by the merging of social networking/media is the transformation of social web applications into egocentric software that put people at the center of applications. Although there had been discussion about a sense of community on the web prior to these innovations, modern social web software makes a wider set of social interactions available to the user, such as "friending" and "following" individuals, even sending them virtual gifts or kisses. Social Web applications are typically built using object oriented programming, utilizing combinations of several programming languages, such as Ruby, PHP, Python, ASP.NET and/or Java. Often APIs are utilized to tie non-social websites to social websites, one example being Campusfood.com.

=== Blogs and wikis ===
Both blogs and Wikis are prime examples of collaboration through the Internet, a feature of the group interaction that characterizes the social Web. Blogs are used as BBS for the 21st century on which people can post discussions, whereas Wikis are constructed and edited by anyone who is granted access to them. Members of both are able to see the recent discussions and changes made, although for many blogs and Wikis such as Wikipedia this is true even for non-members. Blogs and Wikis allow users to share information and educate one another, and these social interaction are focused on content and meaning. Blogs and Wikis are used by both those writing them and those who reference them as resources. Blogs allow members to share ideas and other members to comment on those ideas, while Wikis facilitate group collaboration: both of these tools open a gateway of communication in which social interaction allows the web to develop. These sites are used by teachers and students alike to accomplish the goal of sharing education, and working in a community with other scholars enables the users to see different interpretations of similar subjects as well as to share resources that might not be available to them otherwise.

=== Mobile connectivity support ===
Most social networking services offer mobile apps and internet phone connectivity. Popular social web sites such Facebook Mobile, Orkut, Twitter, and YouTube have led the way for other sites to enable their users to post and share new content with others, update their statuses and receive their friends' updates and uploaded content via mobile platforms.The central aim for both sites offering these mobile services and for those who use them is for the user to maintain contact with their friends online at all times; it allows them to update their profiles and to communicate with each other even when they are away from a computer. It is predicted that this trend will continue in the future, not as other sites follow suit to offer similar services, but as they are extended to other mobile devices that social web users will carry with them in years to come. Social web mobile applications can also allow for augmented reality gaming and experiences; examples of such include SCVGR and Layar.

=== Social features added to non-social sites ===
Web sites that are not built around social interaction nevertheless add features that enable discussion and collaboration out of an interest in expanding their user bases—a trend that is projected to continue in the coming years. As early as 1995 electronic retailer Amazon had implemented such features, especially the customer review, to great success; Joshua Porter, author of Designing for the Social Web, writes:

At Amazon, customer reviews act like a magnet, pulling people down the page. That's the content people want...They keep scrolling until they hit the reviews, which in some cases are up to 6000 pixels down from the top of the page! Nobody seems to mind...Customer reviews allow people to learn about a product from the experience of others without any potentially biased seller information. No wonder everyone wanted to shop at Amazon. They had information that no other site had: they had the Truth. And that truth, interestingly enough, arose from simply aggregating the conversation of normal people.

These customer reviews contribute valuable information that individuals seek out, and are written by users for free simply out of a desire to share their experiences with a product or service with others; the quality and value of each review is further determined by other users, who rate them based upon whether or not they found the feedback helpful, "weeding out the bad (by pushing them to the bottom [of the page])."

Non-retailer, special interest websites have also implemented social web features to broaden their appeal: one example is Allrecipes.com, a community of 10 million cooks that share ideas and recipes with one another. In addition to exchanging recipes with others through the website, users are able to rate and post reviews of recipes they have tried, and to provide suggestions as to how to improve or alter them; according to the website, "The ratings/reviews...are a valuable resource to our community because they show how the members and their families feel about a recipe. Does the recipe get raves—or does it never get made again? Your opinion counts". This feedback is used to evaluate and classify recipes based upon how successfully they passed through the site's "editorial process" and to what extent they were approved by site members, potentially resulting in receiving "Kitchen approved" status that is comparable to Wikipedia's "good article" nomination process. The site has also augmented its services by including social features such as user blogs and connecting with other social networking/media sites like Facebook to expand its presence on the social Web. The recipes found on this website become part of the social web as other members rank them, comment and provide feedback as to why the recipe was good or bad, or to share ways in which they would change it.

The integration of "social" features has also begun to extend into non-Web media forms including print and broadcast. Increasingly prevalent mobile devices have offered a platform for media companies to create hybridised media forms which draw upon the social web, such as the Fango mobile app offered by Australian partnership Yahoo!7 which combines traditional TV programming with live online discussions and existing social networking channels.

=== Social art ===
Artists use the social Web to share their art, be it visual art on sites like deviantART, video art on YouTube, musical art on YouTube or iTunes, or physical art, such as posting and selling crafted items on Craigslist. Artists choose to post their art online so that they can gain critiques on their work, as well as just have the satisfaction of knowing others can experience and enjoy their work. With this social web generation, students spend more time using social tools like computers, video games, video cameras and cell phones. These tools allow the art to be shared easily, and aid in the discussion.

=== Collaborative efforts facilitated by the social web ===
==== Crowdsourcing ====
Crowdsourcing has become one of the ways in which the social Web can be used collaborative efforts, particularly in the last few years, with the dawn of the semantic web and Web 2.0. Modern web applications have the capabilities for crowdsourcing techniques, and consequently the term is now used exclusively for web-based activity. Examples include sites such as SurveyMonkey.com and SurveyU.com; for example, SurveyMonkey enables users to administer surveys to a list of contacts they manage, then collect and analyze response data using basic tools provided on the website itself and finally export these results once they are finished.

Crowdsourcing is used by researchers in order to emulate a traditional focus group, but in a less expensive and less intimate atmosphere. Due to the nature of the social Web, people feel more open to express what their thoughts are on the topic of discussion without feeling as though they will be as heavy scrutinized by the rest of the group when compared to a traditional setting. The Internet serves as a screen, helping to evoke the purest feedback from the participants in the group, as it removes much of a mob mentality.

Facebook has also been a mode in which crowdsourcing can occur, as users typically ask a question in their status message hoping those that see it on his or her news feed will answer the question, or users may opt to use the poll option now available to obtain information from those within their friends network.

==== Community-based software projects ====
Through the use of the social Web, many software developers opt to participate in community-based open-source software projects, as well as hacking projects for proprietary software, kernel (computing) modifications, and freeware ports of games and software. Linux iterations are perfect examples of how effective and efficient this sort of collaboration can be. Google's Android operating system is another example, as many coders work on modifying existing hardware kernels and ROMs to create customized forms of a released Android version. These collaborative efforts for Android take place typically through xda-developers and androidforums.com.

=== Mobile application development ===
Most of the modern mobile applications, and indeed even browser applications, come from released software development kits to developers. The developers create their applications and share them with users via "app markets". Users can comment on their experiences with the applications, allowing all users to view the comments of others, and thus have a greater understanding of what is to be expected from the application. Typically there is also a rating a system in addition to comments.

Mobile social Web applications are built using various APIs. These APIs allow for the interaction and interconnection of data on one social database, be it Facebook, Twitter, or Google Account, thus creating a literal web of data connections. These applications then add to the user experience specific to the application itself. Examples include TweetDeck and Blogger.

== From the social web to real life ==
The way in which individuals share information, and perform tasks such as dating, shopping, and applying for jobs has changed. Now, one's preferences, opinions, and activities are routinely shared with people with whom they may or may not ever meet were it not for the social web.

Many social websites use online social interaction to create a bridge to real life interaction. Relationships are formed between individuals via the internet and then become more personal through other forms of communication. An example of this type of interaction is found on eBay: with more than 94 million active users globally, eBay is the world's largest online marketplace, where anyone can buy and sell practically anything. This website allows individuals to sell items and other to bid on these items. At the end of the auction, the buyer pays the seller; the buyer then sends the purchased product to the winner of the auction. The relationship begins on the internet, but extends into real life interaction. Ways in eBay facilitates this interaction include Skype, a leading online communications service that enables people to communicate through voice or video online for free. eBay Inc. acquired Skype in 2005 and significantly expanded its customer base to more than 480 million registered users in nearly every country on earth. The result of all eBay transactions is a seller providing the buyer with a product, most commonly via mail: web interaction ending in a real world exchange.

The relationship that is formed with eBay users is similar to the users of Craigslist. Users place items that they want to sell on the website, and other users that are looking to purchase these items contact the seller. Craigslist is used to bring together individuals and organizations and connect them to the resources, tools, technology and ideas they need to effectively engage in community building and see the impact of their actions. This is done via email or over the telephone. The buyer and the seller form a meeting in which goods are exchanged for money. Without this type of website, the buyer would not know that the product was available by the seller. This type of website allows members of a physical community to network with the other members of their community to exchange goods and services.

The transaction from web to real life is seen on a macro scale most recently on dating websites, which are used to search and match other users. These websites allow members with a common interest, to find others with this same interest. Academics who have studied the industry believe that it and other forms of electronic communication such as e-mail and social networks are starting to have a significant effect on the ways in which people find love. Users are able to interact with one another and find if they have common interests. Many sites have been developed that target many different interest groups, and relationships form and develop using the internet. If the users decide that they share a mutual bond, they are able to interact via the telephone, and eventually in person. The relationship begins on the internet, but can lead to real life dating and eventually even marriage.

== See also ==
- Digital anthropology – Subdiscipline of anthropology
- Digital sociology
- Sociology of the Internet
- Tribe (internet) – Slang for an unofficial community of people who share a common interest
- Web science – Emerging interdisciplinary field
