= Soetjipto =

Javanese author

Soetjipto (EBI spelling: Sucipto, Javanese: ꦱꦸꦕꦶꦥ꧀ꦠ; born 1910) was a Javanese author and priyayi known for his autobiographical manuscript that explores the theme of homosexuality that's titled Djalan Sampoerna.

== Biography ==
He was born in 1910 and lived in East Java, Dutch East Indies. Although his biological father held the title of raden, he was not from the rich priyayi. His father worked as a bookkeeper at a sugar factory near Surabaya. His parents later divorced because his father became infatuated with another woman and was imprisoned for embezzlement. After the imprisonment, Soetjipto moved to live with his mother, who was residing in Situbondo with her new husband. His stepfather was a coarse Madurese man who, in Soetjipto's view, disliked his presence.

When he was a child, Soetjipto lived in Krian and studied at a European primary school in Mojokerto. His realization of his homosexuality began in 1919 after an encounter with a Dutch man on the street. When Soetjipto dropped his handkerchief, the man picked it up for him, leaving Soetjipto feeling suddenly infatuated and confused. Later, they met again by chance while Soetjipto was attending a Wayang orang performance. Because Soetjipto's clothes were wet from the rain, the man invited him to his house to change. At the man's house, they had sex, and Soetjipto considered him his first love. After his lover left Situbondo, Soetjipto ran away from home around the age of 15 due to family conflicts unrelated to his sexuality. He travelled to Surabaya and lived as a homeless youth. He had a relationship with a Dutchman, and when that ended, he turned to sex work and became selective about the groups of people with whom he associated.

In his autobiography Djalan Sampoerna, Sutjipto also held a view that divided men into four types:

- men who like women,
- men who like men,
- men who have sex with men for money but actually like women, and
- men who like men and act like women.

== Autobiographical manuscript ==
His autobiography was found in the 1970s, by Ulrich Kratz, researcher for traditional malay in the National Library of Indonesia. This book was part of a collection from the personal collection of Hans Overbeck. After Overbeck's death in 1942, his extensive collection of papers and manuscripts was scattered. It was found within the Indonesische Handschriften catalog, a collection compiled by Poerbatjaraka. Tom Boellstorff hypothesized that Hans may have been Soetjipto's lover, which would explain why Hans owned the personal book.

Benedict Anderson regarded him as a gifted writer.
