= Daniel Miller (anthropologist) =

British anthropologist

- Born: 24 March 1954 (age 72)
- Occupation: Anthropologist
- Notable work: Material Culture and Mass Consumption; Stuff

Daniel Miller (born 24 March 1954) is an anthropologist who is closely associated with studies of human relationships to things, the consequences of consumption and digital anthropology. His theoretical work was first developed in Material Culture and Mass Consumption and is summarised more recently in his book Stuff. This work transcends the usual dualism between subject and object and studies how social relations are created through consumption as an activity.

Miller is also the founder of the digital anthropology programme at University College London (UCL), and the director the Why We Post and ASSA projects. He has pioneered the study of digital anthropology and especially ethnographic research on the use and consequences of social media and smartphones as part of the everyday life of ordinary people around the world. He is a Fellow of the British Academy (FBA).

== Education ==
Miller was educated at Highgate School and St John's College, Cambridge, where he read archaeology and anthropology. He has spent his entire professional life at the Department of Anthropology at the University College London, which has become a research centre for the study of material culture and where, more recently, he established the world's first programme dedicated to the study of digital anthropology.

== Anthropological position ==
A prolific author, Miller criticises the concept of materialism which presumes human relationships to things are at the expense of human relationship to other persons. He argues that most people are either enabled to form close relationships to both persons and objects or have difficulties with both.

With Miller's students he has applied these ideas to many genres of material culture such as clothing, homes, media and the car, through research based on the methods of traditional anthropological ethnography in regions including the Caribbean, India and London. In the study of clothing, his work ranges from a book on the Sari in India to more recent research explaining the popularity of blue jeans and the way they exemplify the struggle to become ordinary. His initial work on the consequences of the internet for Trinidad was followed by studies of the impact of mobile phones on poverty in Jamaica and more recently the way Facebook has changed the nature of social relationships.

Miller's work on material culture also includes ethnographic research on how people develop relationships of love and care through the acquisition of objects in shopping and how they deal with issues of separation and loss including death through their retention and divestment of objects. He argues that since we cannot control death as an event, we use our ability to control the gradual separation from the objects associated with the deceased as a way of dealing with loss. Complementary to this work on separation from things are three books about shopping, the most influential of which, A Theory of Shopping, looks at how the study of everyday purchases can be a route to understanding how love operates within the family. He has also carried out several projects on female domestic labour and being a mother, including studies of au pairs, and Filipina women in London and their relationship to their left behind children in the Philippines. Most of these projects are collaborations.

Since the early 2000s, Miller has been researching the effects of new social media on society. Several of his most recent books explore topics such as cell phones, Facebook and transnational families. Together with presenting a theoretical framework for studying social networking sites, his latest work has proposed new concepts such as of 'polymedia' and 'Scalable Sociality' as analytical tools for examining the consequences of a situation where individuals configure and are held responsible for their choice of media, while access and cost recede as factors.

In 2009, Miller created a new Master's programme in Digital anthropology at the Anthropology Department of University College London. Before establishing a new master's programme in digital anthropology, Miller worked with Haidy Geismar who is also an anthropologist, on the examination of the project. In 2012, Miller launched a five-year project called 'Why We Post', to examine the global impact of new social media. The study was based on ethnographic data collected through the course of 15 months in China, India, Turkey, Italy, United Kingdom, Trinidad, Chile and Brazil. The project was funded by the European Research Council. The project published eleven Open Access volumes with UCL Press. The Why We Post monographs are published in the languages of their respective fieldsites. In addition, a free online course (MOOC) is available on FutureLearn. The course is also available in Chinese, Portuguese, Hindi, Tamil, Italian, Turkish, and Spanish on UCLeXtend. In addition a website containing key discoveries, stories and over 100 films is available in the same 8 languages. The book series had had two and a quarter million downloads in 2025.

From 2017-2022 Miller directed a second five-year project, The Anthropology of Smartphones and Smart Ageing (ASSA), which consisted of ten simultaneous ethnographies in Brazil, Cameroon, Chile, China, Japan, Al-Quds (East Jerusalem), Ireland, Italy and Uganda. This project demonstrates how smartphones have developed beyond a youth technology, by focusing on usage by people in mid-life. It argued that the smartphone is more a place within which we now live `The Transportal Home’ than just a communication device. It also considers cheaper alternatives to mHealth through using everyday apps for health purposes and making these more sensitive to social and cultural contexts. A general comparative book called The Global Smartphone was published in 2021. Monographs on the fieldsites are currently being published. Additional publications will focus on their research concerning mHealth.

== Major works ==
- (1984) Miller, D. and Tilley, C. (Eds.) Ideology, Power and Prehistory. Cambridge University Press: Cambridge.
- (1985) Artefacts As Categories: A study of Ceramic Variability in Central India. Cambridge University Press: Cambridge.
- (1987) Material Culture and Mass Consumption. Basil Blackwell: Oxford.
- (1989) Miller, D., Rowlands, M. and Tilley, C. Eds. Domination and Resistance. Unwin Hyman: London.
- (1993) (Ed.) Unwrapping Christmas. Oxford University Press: Oxford.
- (1994) Modernity – An Ethnographic Approach: Dualism and mass consumption in Trinidad. Berg: Oxford.
- (1995) (Ed.) Acknowledging Consumption. Routledge. London.
- (1995) (Ed.) Worlds Apart – Modernity Through the Prism of the Local. Routledge: London.
- (1997) Capitalism – An Ethnographic Approach. Oxford: Berg.
- (1998) (Ed.) Material Cultures. London: UCL Press/University of Chicago Press.
- (1998) A Theory of Shopping. Cambridge: Polity Press/Cornell University Press.
- (1998) P. Jackson, M. Rowlands and D. Miller. Shopping, Place and Identity. London: Routledge.
- (1998) With J. Carrier. Virtualism: a new political economy. Oxford: Berg.
- (2000) With D. Slater The Internet: An Ethnographic Approach. Oxford:Berg.
- (2000) With P. Jackson, M. Lowe and F. Mort (Eds.) Commercial Cultures: economies, practices, spaces. Oxford: Berg.
- (2001) The Dialectics of Shopping (The 1998 Morgan Lectures) Chicago: University of Chicago Press.
- (2001) (Ed.) Car Cultures. Oxford: Oxford: Berg.
- (2001) (Ed.) Acknowledging Consumption (four volumes) London: Routledge.
- (2001) (Ed.) Home Possession: Material culture behind closed doors. Oxford: Berg.
- (2003) With Mukulika Banerjee. The Sari. Oxford: Berg.
- (2005) (Ed.) with Suzanne Küchler. Clothing as Material Culture. Oxford: Berg.
- (2005) (Ed.) Materiality. Durham: Duke University Press.
- (2006) With Heather Horst. The Cell Phone: An Anthropology of Communication. Oxford: Berg.
- (2008) The Comfort of Things. Polity: Cambridge.
- (2009) (Ed.) Anthropology and the Individual: a material culture perspective. Oxford: Berg.
- (2010) Stuff. Cambridge: Polity.
- (2010) With Zuzana Búriková. Au-Pair. Cambridge: Polity.
- (2011) With Sophie Woodward (Eds.) Global Denim. Oxford: Berg.
- (2011) Tales from Facebook. Cambridge: Polity.
- (2011) With Sophie Woodward. Blue Jeans: The art of the ordinary. Berkeley: University of California Press.
- (2011) Weihnachten – Das globale Fest (in German) Suhrkamp.
- (2012) With Mirca Madianou. Migration and New Media: Transnational Families and Polymedia. London: Routledge.
- (2012) Consumption and its Consequences. Cambridge: Polity.
- (2012) Edited with Heather Horst. Digital Anthropology. Oxford: Berg.
- (2014) With Jolynna Sinanan. Webcam. Cambridge: Polity.
- (2016-2018) Responsible for the Why We Post book series with UCL Press that in July 2020 passed one million downloads.
- (2016) Social Media in an English Village. London: UCL Press
- (2016) With Elisabetta Costa; Nell Haynes; Tom McDonald; Răzvan Nicolescu; Jolynna Sinanan; Juliano Spyer; Shriram Venkatraman and Xinyuan Wang How the World Changed Social Media. London: UCL Press.
- (2017) With Jolynna Sinanan. Visualising Facebook. London: UCL Press.
- (2017) The Comfort of People. Cambridge, Polity.
- (2017) Miller, D. Anthropology is the discipline but the goal is ethnography. University College London.
- (2017) Miller, D. Christmas: An anthropological lens. Journal of Ethnographic Theory. University College of London.
- (2017) The ideology of friendship in the era of Facebook. Journal of Ethnographic Theory. University College of London.
- (2018) Miller, D and Venatraman, S. Facebook Interactions: An Ethnographic Perspective. University College London. Indraprastha Institute of Information Technology, India.
- (2019) Miller, D. Contemporary Comparative Anthropology: The Why We Post Project. Ethnos.
- (2021) With Pauline Garvey. Ageing with Smartphones in Ireland. London: UCL Press
- (2021) With Patrick Awondo, Marília Duque, Pauline Garvey, Laura Haapio-Kirk, Charlotte Hawkins, Alfonso Otaegui, Laila Abed Rabho, Maya de Vries, Shireen Walton, and Xinyuan Wang. The Global Smartphone: Beyond a youth technology. London: UCL Press
- (2024) The Good Enough Life. Cambridge: Polity Press. (Chinese – East China Normal University, Korean – Sangsang Square, Italian - Ledizioni)
- (2024) An Anthropological Approach to mHealth (Co-Edited with Charlotte Hawkins and Patrick Awondo). UCL Press
- (2025) Ed. With Pauline Garvey. The Age of Retirement: An Anthropological Perspective. London Berghahn Press
- (2026) Ed. With Xinyuan Wang. Understanding China through Digital Anthropology. London: UCL Press
