= Why We Post =

Why We Post is a research project funded by the European Research Council and launched in 2012 by Daniel Miller with the objective of examining the global impact of new social media. The study is based on ethnographic data collected through the course of 15 months in China, India, Turkey, Italy, United Kingdom, Trinidad, Chile and Brazil.

The results of this project were released on 29 February 2016. This included the first three of eleven Open Access books (available via UCL Press), a five-week e-course (MOOC) on FutureLearn in English, also available in Chinese, Portuguese, Hindi, Tamil, Italian, Turkish, and Spanish on UCLeXtend. In addition a website containing key discoveries, stories and over 100 films is available in the same 8 languages.
