= Sociology of the Internet =

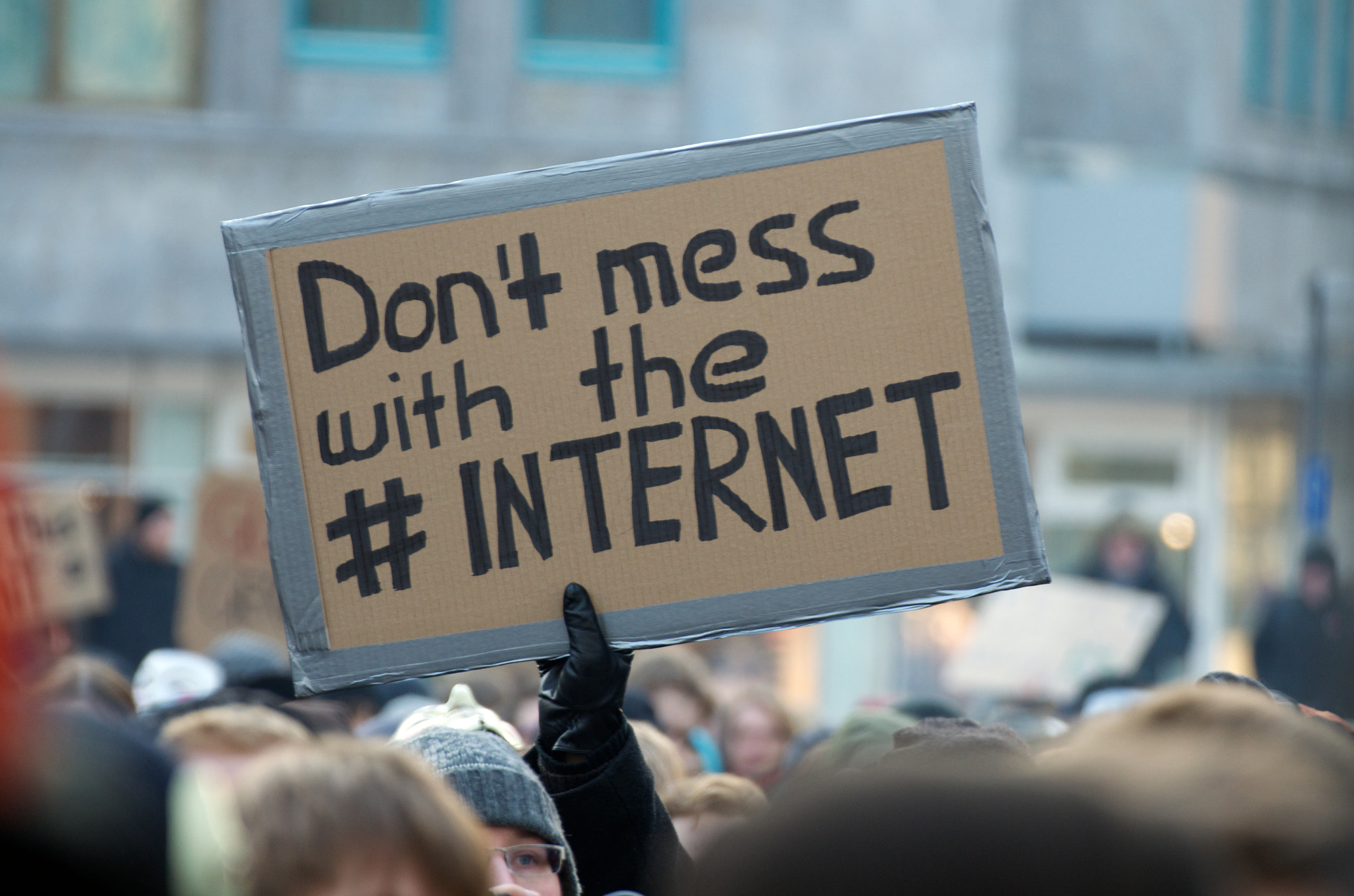
Anti-internet censorship protest in Frankfurt, Germany

The sociology of the Internet, also known as the social psychology of the Internet, studies how sociological and social psychological theories and methods apply to the Internet as a source of information and communication. It examines the social implications of the technology, including new social networks, virtual communities, online interactions, and issues such as cybercrime. A related field, digital sociology, focuses on understanding digital media as a part of everyday life and its influence on social relationships, behavior, and identity.

The Internet, as a major information breakthrough, is of interest to sociologists both as a research tool and as a subject of study. It enables online surveys, discussion platforms, and other data-collection methods. The sociology of the Internet focuses on online communities, virtual worlds, and organizational changes driven by digital media, as well as broader social transformations from industrial to information societies. Researchers examine online communities using statistical methods, such as network analysis, and qualitative approaches, including virtual ethnography. Social change is studied through demographic data or by interpreting evolving messages and symbols in digital media.

== Emergence of the discipline ==
The Internet is a relatively new phenomenon. As Robert Darnton wrote, it is a revolutionary change that "took place yesterday, or the day before, depending on how you measure it." The Internet developed from the ARPANET, dating back to 1969; as a term it was coined in 1974. The World Wide Web as we know it was shaped in the mid-1990s, when graphical interface and services like email became popular and reached wider (non-scientific and non-military) audiences and commerce. Internet Explorer was first released in 1995; Netscape a year earlier. Google was founded in 1998. Wikipedia was founded in 2001. Facebook, MySpace, and YouTube in the mid-2000s. Web 2.0 is still emerging. The amount of information available on the net and the number of Internet users worldwide has continued to grow rapidly. The term 'digital sociology' is now becoming increasingly used to denote new directions in sociological research into digital technologies since Web 2.0.

=== Digital sociology ===
The first scholarly article to have the term digital sociology in the title appeared in 2009. The author reflects on how digital technologies may influence both sociological research and teaching. In 2010, 'digital sociology' was described by Richard Neal as bridging the growing academic focus and the increasing interest from global business. It was not until 2013 that the first purely academic book tackling the subject of 'digital sociology' was published. The first sole-authored book entitled Digital Sociology was published in 2015, and the first academic conference on "Digital Sociology" was held in New York, NY in the same year.

Although the term digital sociology has not yet fully entered the cultural lexicon, sociologists have conducted research on the Internet since its inception. These sociologists have addressed many social issues relating to online communities, cyberspace, and cyber-identities. This and similar research has attracted many names, such as cyber-sociology, the sociology of the internet, the sociology of online communities, the sociology of social media, the sociology of cyberculture, or something else again.

Digital sociology differs from these terms in that it has a broader scope, addressing not only the Internet or cyberculture but also the impact of other digital media and devices that have emerged since the first decade of the twenty-first century. Since the Internet has become more pervasive and linked to everyday life, references to the 'cyber' in the social sciences now seem to have been replaced by the 'digital'. 'Digital sociology' is related to other sub-disciplines such as digital humanities and digital anthropology. It is beginning to supersede and incorporate the other titles above, as well as including the newest Web 2.0 digital technologies into its purview, such as wearable technology, augmented reality, smart objects, the Internet of Things, and big data.

== Research trends ==
According to DiMaggio et al. (1999), research tends to focus on the Internet's implications in five domains:

1. inequality (the issues of digital divide)
2. public and social capital (the issues of date displacement)
3. political participation (the issues of public sphere, deliberative democracy and civil society)
4. organizations and other economic institutions
5. participatory culture and cultural diversity

Early on, there were predictions that the Internet would change everything (or nothing); over time, however, a consensus emerged that the Internet, at least in the current phase of development, complements rather than displaces previously implemented media. This has meant a rethinking of the 1990s ideas of "convergence of new and old media". Further, the Internet offers a rare opportunity to study changes caused by the newly emerged—and likely, still evolving—information and communication technology (ICT).

== Social impact ==
The Internet has created social network services, forums of social interaction and social relations, such as Facebook, MySpace, Meetup, and CouchSurfing which facilitate both online and offline interaction.

Though virtual communities were once thought to be composed of strictly virtual social ties, researchers often find that even those social ties formed in virtual spaces are often maintained both online and offline.

There are ongoing debates about the impact of the Internet on strong and weak ties, whether the Internet is creating more or less social capital, the Internet's role in trends towards social isolation, and whether it creates a more or less diverse social environment.

It is often said that the Internet is a new frontier, and some argue that social interaction, cooperation, and conflict among users resemble the anarchic and violent American frontier of the early 19th century.

In March 2014, researchers from the Benedictine University at Mesa in Arizona studied how online interactions affect face-to-face meetings. The study is titled, "Face to Face Versus Facebook: Does Exposure to Social Networking Web Sites Augment or Attenuate Physiological Arousal Among the Socially Anxious," published in Cyberpsychology, Behavior, and Social Networking. They analyzed 26 female students with electrodes to measure social anxiety. Before meeting people, the students were shown pictures of the subjects they were expected to meet. Researchers found that meeting someone face-to-face after looking at their photos increases arousal, which the study linked to an increase in social anxiety. These findings confirm previous studies that found that socially anxious people prefer online interactions. The study also recognized that arousal can be associated with positive emotions and may lead to positive feelings.

Recent research has taken the Internet of Things into its purview, as global networks of interconnected everyday objects are seen as the next step in technological advancement. Certainly, global space- and earth-based networks are expanding coverage of the IoT at a fast pace. This has wide-ranging consequences, with current applications in the health, agriculture, transportation, and retail sectors. Companies such as Samsung and Sigfox have invested heavily in said networks, and their social impact will have to be measured accordingly, with some sociologists suggesting the formation of socio-technical networks of humans and technical systems. Issues of privacy, right to information, legislation, and content creation will come into public scrutiny in light of these technological changes.

== Digital sociology and data emotions ==
Digital sociology is connected with data and data emotions. Data emotions occur when people use digital technologies that can affect their decision-making skills or emotions. Social media platforms collect user data and also affect users' emotional states, which can lead to either solidarity or social engagement. Social media platforms such as Instagram and Twitter can evoke emotions of love, affection, and empathy. Viral challenges such as the 2014 Ice Bucket Challenge and viral memes have brought people together through mass participation, displaying cultural knowledge and self-understanding. Mass participation in viral events prompts users to share information (data), affecting psychological states and emotions. The link between digital sociology and data emotions arises from the integration of technological devices into everyday life and activities.

=== Impact on children ===
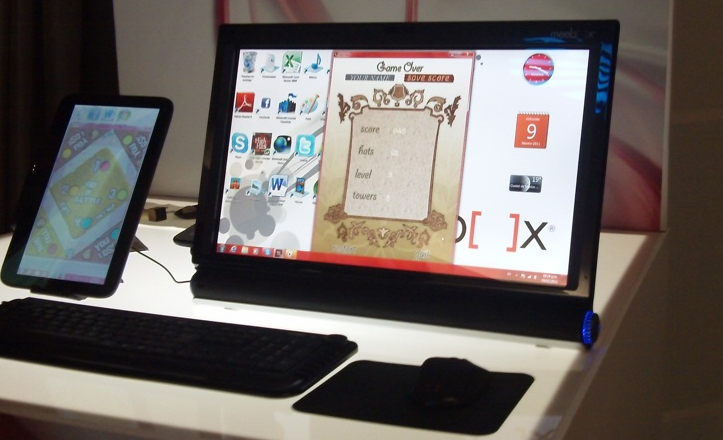
Technological devices can be used intensively.

Researchers have investigated the use of technology (as opposed to the Internet) by children and how it can be used excessively, where it can cause medical health and psychological issues. The use of technological devices by children can cause them to develop addictions and can lead them to experience negative effects such as depression, attention problems, loneliness, anxiety, aggression and solitude. Obesity is another result of the use of technology by children, due to how children may prefer to use their technological devices rather than doing any form of physical activity. Parents can take control and implement restrictions to the use of technological devices by their children, which will decrease the negative results technology can have if it is prioritized as well as help put a limit to it being used excessively.

Children can use technology to enhance their learning; for example, they can use online programs to improve their reading and math skills. The resources technology provides for children may enhance their skills, but children should be cautious of what they get themselves into due to how cyberbullying may occur. Cyber bullying can cause academic and psychological effects due to how children are suppressed by people who bully them through the Internet. When technology is introduced to children, they are not forced to accept it, but instead, children are permitted to have an input on what they feel about either deciding to use their technological device or not. . The routines of children have changed due to the increasing popularity of Internet connected devices, with Social Policy researcher Janet Heaton concluding that, "while the children's health and quality of life benefited from the technology, the time demands of the care routines and lack of compatibility with other social and institutional timeframes had some negative implications". Children's frequent use of technology commonly leads to decreased time available to pursue meaningful friendships, hobbies and potential career options.

While technology can negatively affect children's lives, it can also serve as a valuable learning tool that encourages cognitive, linguistic, and social development. In a 2010 study by the University of New Hampshire, children who used technological devices showed greater improvements in problem-solving, intelligence, language skills, and structural knowledge than those who did not incorporate technology into their learning. In a 1999 paper, it was concluded that "studies did find improvements in student scores on tests closely related to material covered in computer-assisted instructional packages", which demonstrates how technology can have positive influences on children by improving their learning capabilities. Problems have arisen between children and their parents as well when parents limit what children can use their technological devices for, specifically what they can and cannot watch on their devices, making children frustrated.

=== Political organization and censorship ===
The Internet has achieved new relevance as a political tool. The presidential campaign of Howard Dean in 2004 in the United States became famous for its ability to generate donations via the Internet, and the 2008 campaign of Barack Obama became even more so. Increasingly, social movements and other organizations use the Internet to carry out both traditional and new Internet activism.

Some governments are also getting online. Some countries, such as those of Cuba, Iran, North Korea, Myanmar, the People's Republic of China, and Saudi Arabia use filtering and censoring software to restrict what people in their countries can access on the Internet. In the United Kingdom, they also use software to locate and arrest various individuals they perceive as a threat. Other countries, including the United States, have enacted laws making the possession or distribution of certain material, such as child pornography, illegal, but do not use filtering software. In some countries, Internet service providers have agreed to restrict access to sites listed by the police.

=== Economics ===
While much has been written of the economic advantages of Internet-enabled commerce, there is also evidence that some aspects of the Internet such as maps and location-aware services may serve to reinforce economic inequality and the digital divide. Electronic commerce may be responsible for consolidation and the decline of mom-and-pop, brick and mortar businesses resulting in increases in income inequality.

=== Philanthropy ===
The spread of low-cost Internet access in developing countries has opened new possibilities for peer-to-peer charities, which allow individuals to contribute small amounts to charitable projects for others. Websites such as Donors Choose and Global Giving now allow small-scale donors to direct funds to individual projects of their choice.

A popular twist on Internet-based philanthropy is the use of peer-to-peer lending for charitable purposes. Kiva pioneered this concept in 2005, offering the first web-based service to publish individual loan profiles for funding. Kiva raises funds for local intermediary microfinance organizations, which post stories and updates on behalf of the borrowers. Lenders can contribute as little as $25 to loans of their choice, and receive their money back as borrowers repay. Kiva falls short of being a pure peer-to-peer charity because loans are disbursed before lenders fund them, and borrowers do not communicate directly with lenders. However, the recent spread of cheap Internet access in developing countries has made genuine peer-to-peer connections increasingly feasible. In 2009, the US-based nonprofit Zidisha tapped into this trend to launch the first peer-to-peer microlending platform, linking lenders and borrowers across international borders without local intermediaries. Inspired by interactive websites such as Facebook and eBay, Zidisha's microlending platform facilitates direct dialogue between lenders and borrowers and a performance rating system for borrowers. Web users worldwide can fund loans for as little as a dollar.

=== Leisure ===
The Internet has been a major source of leisure since before the World Wide Web, with entertaining social experiments such as MUDs and MOOs being conducted on university servers, and humor-related Usenet groups receiving much of the main traffic. Today, many Internet forums have sections devoted to games and funny videos; short cartoons in the form of Flash movies are also popular. Over 6 million people use blogs or message boards to communicate and share ideas.

The pornography and gambling industries have both taken full advantage of the World Wide Web, and often provide a significant source of advertising revenue for other websites. Although governments have made attempts to censor Internet porn, Internet service providers have told governments that these plans are not feasible. Many governments have attempted to put restrictions on both industries' use of the Internet, but this has generally failed to stop their widespread popularity.

One area of leisure on the Internet is online gaming. This form of leisure is said by its community to bring together people of all ages and backgrounds to enjoy playing multiplayer games with one another. Genres of online games with diverse communities include, among others, MMORPGs, first-person shooters,s role-playing video games, and online gambling. This has greatly shifted the way many people interact and spend their free time on the Internet.

While online gaming has been around since the 1970s, modern online gaming began with services such as GameSpy and MPlayer, which players would typically subscribe to. Non-subscribers were limited to certain types of gameplay or certain games.

Many use the Internet to access and download music, movies, and other works for their enjoyment and relaxation. As discussed above, there are paid and unpaid sources for all of these, using centralized servers and distributed peer-to-peer technologies. Discretion is needed, as some of these sources take greater care with the original artists' rights and copyright laws than others.

Many use the World Wide Web to access news, weather, and sports reports, to plan and book holidays, and to find out more about their random ideas and casual interests.

People use chat, messaging, and email to make and stay in touch with friends worldwide, sometimes in the same way as some previously had pen pals. Social networking websites like MySpace, Facebook, and many others like them also put and keep people in contact for their enjoyment.

The Internet has seen a growing number of Web desktops that allow users to access their files, folders, and settings online.

Cyberslacking has become a serious drain on corporate resources; the average UK employee spends 57 minutes a day surfing the Web at work, according to a study by Peninsula Business Services.

== Subfields ==
Four aspects of digital sociology have been identified by Lupton (2012):

1. Professional digital practice: using digital media tools for professional purposes: to build networks, construct an e-profile, publicise and share research, and instruct students.
2. Sociological analyses of digital use: researching how people's use of digital media configures their sense of selves, their embodiment, and their social relations.
3. Digital data analysis: using digital data for social research, either quantitative or qualitative.
4. Critical digital sociology: undertaking reflexive and critical analysis of digital media informed by social and cultural theory.

=== Professional digital practice ===
Although they have been reluctant to use social and other digital media for professional academic purposes, sociologists are slowly beginning to adopt them for teaching and research. An increasing number of sociological blogs are beginning to appear, and more sociologists are joining Twitter, for example. Some are writing about the best ways for sociologists to use social media in academic practice, the importance of self-archiving and making sociological research open access, and writing for Wikipedia.

=== Sociological analyses of digital media use ===
Digital sociologists have begun to write about the use of wearable technologies as part of quantifying the body and the social dimensions of big data and the algorithms that are used to interpret these data. Others have directed attention at the role of digital technologies as part of the surveillance of people's activities, via such technologies as CCTV cameras and customer loyalty schemes as well as the mass surveillance of the Internet that is being conducted by secret services such as the NSA.

The 'digital divide', or the differences in access to digital technologies experienced by certain social groups such as the socioeconomically disadvantaged, those of lower education levels, women, and the elderly, has preoccupied many researchers in the social scientific study of digital media. However, several sociologists have pointed out that while it is important to acknowledge and identify the structural inequalities inherent in differentials in digital technology use, this concept is overly simplistic and fails to account for the complexities of access to and knowledge of digital technologies.

There is growing interest in how social media contributes to the development of intimate relationships and concepts of the self. One of the best-known sociologists who has written about social relationships, selfhood, and digital technologies is Sherry Turkle. In her most recent book, Turkle addresses the topic of social media. She argues that relationships conducted via these platforms are not as authentic as those encounters that take place "in real life".

Visual media allows the viewer to be a more passive consumer of information. Viewers are more likely to develop online personas that differ from their personas in the real world. This contrast between the digital world (or 'cyberspace') and the 'real world', however, has been critiqued as 'digital dualism', a concept similar to the 'aura of the digital'. Other sociologists have argued that relationships conducted through digital media are inextricably part of the 'real world'. Augmented reality is an interactive experience where reality is being altered in some way by the use of digital media, but not replaced.

The use of social media for social activism has also provided a focus for digital sociology. For example, numerous sociological articles, and at least one book have appeared on the use of such social media platforms as Twitter, YouTube, and Facebook as a means of conveying messages about activist causes and organizing political movements.

Research has also been done on how racial minorities and the use of technology by racial minorities and other groups. These "digital practice" studies explore how the practices that groups adopt when using new technologies mitigate or reproduce social inequalities.

=== Digital data analysis ===
Digital sociologists use varied approaches to investigating people's use of digital media, both qualitative and quantitative. These include ethnographic research, interviews and surveys with users of technologies, and also the analysis of the data produced from people's interactions with technologies: for example, their posts on social media platforms such as Facebook, Instagram, Pinterest, 4chan, Tumblr and Twitter or their consuming habits on online shopping platforms. Techniques such as data scraping, social network analysis, time series analysis, and textual analysis are employed to analyze both data produced as a byproduct of users' interactions with digital media and data that they create themselves. For Contents Analysis, in 2008, Yukihiko Yoshida did a study called "Leni Riefenstahl and German expressionism: research in Visual Cultural Studies using the trans-disciplinary semantic spaces of specialized dictionaries." The study used databases of images tagged with connotative and denotative keywords (a search engine) and found that Riefenstahl's imagery had the same qualities as imagery tagged "degenerate" in the title of the exhibition, "Degenerate Art," in Germany in 1937.

The emergence of social media has provided sociologists with a new way of studying social phenomena. Social media networks, such as Facebook and Twitter, are increasingly being mined for research. For example, Twitter data is easily available to researchers through the Twitter API. Twitter provides researchers with demographic data, time and location data, and connections between users. From these data, researchers gain insight into user moods and how they communicate with one another. Furthermore, social networks can be represented as graphs and visualized.

Using large datasets, such as those obtained from Twitter, can be challenging. First, researchers need to determine how to store this data effectively in a database. Several tools commonly used in Big Data analytics are available to them. Since large data sets can be unwieldy and contain numerous types of data (i.e., photos, videos, GIF images), researchers have the option of storing their data in non-relational databases, such as MongoDB and Hadoop. Processing and querying this data is an additional challenge. However, there are several options available to researchers. One common option is to use a querying language, such as Hive, in conjunction with Hadoop to analyze large data sets.

The Internet and social media have allowed sociologists to study how controversial topics are discussed over time—otherwise known as Issue Mapping. Sociologists can search social networking sites (i.e. Facebook or Twitter) for posts related to a hotly-debated topic, then parse through and analyze the text. Sociologists can then use some easily accessible tools to visualize this data, such as MentionMapp or Twitter Streamgraph. MentionMapp shows how popular a hashtag is, and Twitter Streamgraph depicts how often certain words co-occur and how their relationships change over time.

== Digital surveillance ==
Digital surveillance occurs when digital devices record people's daily activities, collect and store personal data, and invade privacy. With the advancement of new technologies, the act of monitoring and watching people online has increased between 2010 and 2020. The invasion of privacy and the recording of people without consent lead people to doubt the use of technologies that are supposed to secure and protect personal information. The storage of data and intrusiveness in digital surveillance affect human behavior. The psychological implications of digital surveillance can lead people to feel concerned, worried, or fearful about constant monitoring. Digital data is stored in security technologies, apps, social media platforms, and other devices, and can be used in various ways for various reasons. Data collected from people using the Internet can be monitored and viewed by private and public companies, friends, and other known or unknown entities.

=== Critical digital sociology ===
This aspect of digital sociology is perhaps what makes it distinctive from other approaches to studying the digital world. By adopting a critical reflexive approach, sociologists can address the implications of the digital for sociological practice itself. It has been argued that digital sociology offers a way of addressing the changing relations between social relations and the analysis of these relations, putting into question what social research is, and indeed, what sociology is now as social relations and society have become in many respects mediated via digital technologies.

How should sociology respond to the emergent forms of both 'small data' and 'big data' that are collected in vast amounts as part of people's interactions with digital technologies and the development of data industries using these data to conduct their own social research? Does this suggest that a "coming crisis in empirical sociology" might be on the horizon? How are the identities and work practices of sociologists themselves becoming implicated within and disciplined by digital technologies such as citation metrics?

These questions are central to critical digital sociology, which reflects on the role of sociology itself in the analysis of digital technologies, as well as the impact of digital technologies on sociology.

To these four aspects, add the following subfields of digital sociology:

=== Public digital sociology ===
Public sociology using digital media is a form of public sociology that involves publishing sociological materials in online, publicly accessible spaces and subsequent interaction with the public in these spaces. This has been referred to as "e-public sociology".

Social media has changed the way the sociology is perceived and given rise to digital evolution in this field. The open platform for communication has provided sociologists with opportunities to move beyond the notion of small-group sociology to reach a global audience.

Blogging was the first social media platform used by sociologists. Sociologists like Eszter Hargittai, Chris Bertram, and Kieran Healy were among the few who began using blogging in sociology. New discussion groups on sociology and related philosophy were a consequence of social media's impact. The vast number of comments and discussions thus became a part of understanding sociology. One of such famous groups was Crooked Timber. Getting feedback on such social sites is faster and more impactful. Disintermediation, visibility, and measurement are the major effects of e-public sociology. Other social media tools, like Twitter and Facebook, also became tools for sociologists. "Public Sociology in the Age of Social Media".

=== Digital transformation of sociological theory ===
Information and communication technology, along with the proliferation of digital data, is revolutionizing sociological research. Whereas there is already much methodological innovation in digital humanities and computational social sciences, theory development in the social sciences and humanities still consists mainly of print theories of computer cultures or societies. These analogue theories of the digital transformation, however, fail to account for how profoundly the digital transformation of the social sciences and humanities is changing the epistemic core of these fields. Digital methods constitute more than providers of ever-bigger digital datasets for testing of analogue theories, but also require new forms of digital theorising. The ambition of research programmes on the digital transformation of social theory is therefore to translate analogue into digital social theories to complement traditional analogue social theories of the digital transformation by digital theories of digital societies.

== See also ==
- Anthropology of cyberspace
- Computational social science
- Cyber-dissident
- Design anthropology
- Digital anthropology
- Digital humanities
- Digital Revolution
- Internet culture
- Internet vigilantism
- Slacktivism
- Social informatics
- Social web
- Sociology of science and technology
- Software studies
- Technology and society
- Tribe (internet)
- Virtual volunteering
