= Polymedia =

Polymedia is an anthropological notion that was introduced by Daniel Miller and Mirca Madianou in recognition of the way most people today use a wide variety of communication media. They claim that as individual communication acts are no longer dictated by access and cost, people are likely to be judged on why they selected one particular medium rather than others, for example in breaking up a relationship.

Through ethnographic research on transnational familial communication, particularly between mothers and their children, Madianou and Miller found mediated communication does not take place over a single technology but by choosing among and commingling a variety of media technologies. According to Mirca Madianou and Daniel Miller, rather than relying on technological determinism “the situation of polymedia is one in which the media are mediated by the relationship as well as the other way around.”

Expanding on the idea of polymedia, communication scholars Herbig, Herrmann, and Tyma extended the concept, not only as a social and technological practice, but as an important entry point for discussion in a “polymediated age.” As they note, “The ‘poly’ in polymediation not only signifies the many forms that media take, but the many different interactions we can have with them.”

They also suggest that polymediation “is both the process and product resulting from media producers—who can be everyone and anyone with access—existing within a converged media state” that “moves beyond media convergence alone, by examining the simultaneous processes and outcomes of convergence and fragmentation" and "Since individuals can act as producers, audiences, and critics, the term polymediation can be utilized as a noun, verb, adjective, and adverb.”

Similarly, according to Calka, polymediation has definitive characteristics: ubiquity, shape-shifting authorship, simultaneous fragmenting and merging of identity, and division/communality.

The UK Govt Foresight report recognizes polymedia as the way individuals configure a particular combination of media in their communication as an aspect of contemporary identity.
