= Journal of Material Culture =

- Discipline: Anthropology
- Language: English
- Edited by: Hannah Knox

Publication details
- History: 1996–present
- Publisher: SAGE Publications
- Frequency: Quarterly
- Impact factor: 0.610 (2014)

Standard abbreviations
- ISO 4: J. Mater. Cult.

Indexing
- ISSN: 1359-1835 (print); 1460-3586 (web)
- LCCN: sn96031075
- OCLC no.: 34536849

Links
- Journal homepage; Online access; Online archive

Journal of Material Culture is a peer-reviewed academic journal that publishes papers in the fields of Cultural Studies and Anthropology. The journal's editor is Hannah Knox (University College London); the other members of the Material Culture subsection of UCL Anthropology serve as managing editors. It has been in publication since 1996 and is currently published by SAGE Publications.

== Scope ==
Journal of Material Culture focuses on the relationship between artefacts and social relations irrespective of time and place and aims to explore the linkage between the construction of social identities and the production and use of culture. Journal of Material Culture draws on a range of disciplines including anthropology, archaeology, design studies, history, human geography and museology.

== Abstracting and indexing ==
Journal of Material Culture is abstracted and indexed in, among other databases, SCOPUS and the Social Sciences Citation Index. As of 2014, its impact factor is 0.610, ranking it 7/38 in Cultural Studies journals and 49/84 in Anthropology journals.
