= Tom Boellstorff =

American anthropologist

- Born: 1969 (age 56–57)
- Education: Stanford University (PhD, 2000)
- Awards: Ruth Benedict Prize
- Scientific career
- Fields: Anthropology
- Workplaces: University of California, Irvine

Tom Boellstorff (born 1969) is an anthropologist based at the University of California, Irvine. In his career to date, his interests have included the anthropology of sexuality, the anthropology of globalization, digital anthropology, Southeast Asian studies, the anthropology of HIV/AIDS, and linguistic anthropology.

== Career ==
Boellstorff earned his Ph.D. in anthropology at Stanford University in 2000. He joined the Department of Anthropology at the University of California, Irvine in 2002, receiving tenure in 2006. He is the winner of the Ruth Benedict Prize given by the Society of Lesbian and Gay Anthropologists. From 2007 to 2012 he was editor-in-chief of American Anthropologist, the flagship journal of the American Anthropological Association, and co-edits the Princeton University Press book series "Princeton Studies in Culture and Technology." He has been co-chair of the Association for Queer Anthropology (formerly the Society of Lesbian and Gay Anthropologists). He has received a fellowship from the American Council of Learned Societies and research support from the National Science Foundation and the Social Science Research Council. In 2016 he was made a Fellow of the American Association for the Advancement of Science. He has conducted research on LGBT sexualities in Indonesia and on culture in virtual worlds, including disability experience in Second Life (see the documentary Our Digital Selves: My Avatar Is Me).

His work has been published in American Anthropologist; American Ethnologist; Annual Review of Anthropology, Cultural Anthropology; Current Anthropology, Environment and Planning D; Ethnos, Games and Culture, GLQ: A Journal of Lesbian and Gay Studies; Information, Communication, and Society; International Journal of Communication; Journal of Linguistic Anthropology; Journal of Asian Studies; and Media, Culture, and Society.

He is also the co-editor of Data, Now Bigger and Better! (Prickly Paradigm Press, 2015) and Speaking in Queer Tongues: Globalization and Gay Language (University of Illinois Press, 2004).

== Biography ==
Raised in Nebraska, Boellstorff moved to California to obtain bachelor's degrees in linguistics and music from Stanford University. He engaged in HIV/AIDS and LGBT activism in the United States, Indonesia, Malaysia, and Russia, at times with the International Gay and Lesbian Human Rights Commission (now Outright International) and the Institute for Community Health Outreach, where he worked as Regional Coordinator before entering graduate school in anthropology.

His husband, Bill Maurer, is Professor in the Department of Anthropology and Dean of Social Sciences at the University of California, Irvine.

== Publications ==
- Coming of Age in Second Life: An Anthropologist Explores the Virtually Human (Princeton University Press, 2008, Second Edition 2015)
- Ethnography and Virtual Worlds: A Handbook of Method (Princeton University Press, 2012; coauthored with Bonnie Nardi, Celia Pearce, and T.L. Taylor)
- A Coincidence of Desires: Anthropology, Queer Studies, Indonesia (Duke University Press, 2007)
- The Gay Archipelago: Sexuality and Nation in Indonesia (Princeton University Press, 2005)

== See also ==
- Digital anthropology
