= Digital anthropology =

Subdiscipline of anthropology

Digital anthropology is the anthropological study of the relationship between humans and digital-era technology. The field is new, and thus has a variety of names with a variety of emphases. These include techno-anthropology, digital ethnography, cyberanthropology, and virtual anthropology.

== Definition and scope ==
Most anthropologists who use the phrase "digital anthropology" are specifically referring to online and Internet technology. The study of humans' relationship to a broader range of technology may fall under other subfields of anthropological study, such as cyborg anthropology.

The Digital Anthropology Group (DANG) is classified as an interest group in the American Anthropological Association. DANG's mission includes promoting the use of digital technology as a tool of anthropological research, encouraging anthropologists to share research using digital platforms, and outlining ways for anthropologists to study digital communities.

Cyberspace or the "virtual world" itself can serve as a "field" site for anthropologists, allowing the observation, analysis, and interpretation of the sociocultural phenomena springing up and taking place in any interactive space.

National and transnational communities, enabled by digital technology, establish a set of social norms, practices, traditions, storied history and associated collective memory, migration periods, internal and external conflicts, potentially subconscious language features and memetic dialects comparable to those of traditional, geographically confined communities. This includes the various communities built around free and open-source software, online platforms such as Facebook, Twitter/X, Instagram, 4chan and Reddit and their respective sub-sites, and politically motivated groups like Anonymous, WikiLeaks, or the Occupy movement.

A number of academic anthropologists have conducted traditional ethnographies of virtual worlds, such as Bonnie Nardi's study of World of Warcraft or Tom Boellstorff's study of Second Life. Academic Gabriella Coleman has done ethnographic work on the Debian software community and the Anonymous hacktivist network. Eitan Y. Wilf examines the intersection of artists' creativity and digital technology and artificial intelligence. Yongming Zhou studied how in China the internet is used to participate in politics. Eve M. Zucker and colleagues study the shift to digital memorialization of mass atrocities and the emergent role of artificial intelligence in these processes. Victoria Bernal conducted ethnographic research on the themes of nationalism and citizenship among Eritreans participating in online political engagement with their homeland.

Anthropological research can help designers adapt and improve technology. Australian anthropologist Genevieve Bell did extensive user experience research at Intel that informed the company's approach to its technology, users, and market.

== Methodology ==
=== Digital fieldwork ===
Many digital anthropologists who study online communities use traditional methods of anthropological research. They participate in online communities in order to learn about their customs and worldviews, and back their observations with private interviews, historical research, and quantitative data. Their product is an ethnography, a qualitative description of their experience and analyses.

Other anthropologists and social scientists have conducted research that emphasizes data gathered by websites and servers. However, academics often have trouble accessing user data on the same scale as social media corporations like Facebook and data mining companies like Acxiom.

In terms of method, there is a disagreement in whether it is possible to conduct research exclusively online or if research will only be complete when the subjects are studied holistically, both online and offline. Tom Boellstorff, who conducted a three-year research as an avatar in the virtual world Second Life, defends the first approach, stating that it is not just possible, but necessary to engage with subjects “in their own terms”. Others, such as Daniel Miller, have argued that an ethnographic research should not exclude learning about the subject's life outside the internet.

=== Digital technology as a tool of anthropology ===
The American Anthropological Association offers an online guide for students using digital technology to store and share data. Data can be uploaded to digital databases to be stored, shared, and interpreted. Text and numerical analysis software can help produce metadata, while a codebook may help organize data.

== Ethics ==
Online fieldwork offers new ethical challenges. According to the American Anthropological Association's ethics guidelines, anthropologists researching a community must make sure that all members of that community know they are being studied and have access to data the anthropologist produces. However, many online communities' interactions are publicly available for anyone to read, and may be preserved online for years. Digital anthropologists debate the extent to which lurking in online communities and sifting through public archives is ethical.

The Association also asserts that anthropologists' ability to collect and store data at all is "a privilege", and researchers have an ethical duty to store digital data responsibly. This means protecting the identity of participants, sharing data with other anthropologists, and making backup copies of all data.

== Prominent figures ==
- Genevieve Bell is an Australian cultural anthropologist credited for pioneering the User Experience field. During her time working for Intel Corporation, Bell studied how various cultures from around the world interacted with and experienced technology. Researching and improving user experience allows companies and designers to gather data regarding how users utilize their digital products and what requires improvement or expansion.
- Tom Boellstorff is an anthropologist known for Coming of Age in Second Life: An Anthropologist Explores the Virtually Human where he conducted research on how engaging in virtual worlds affects the player’s sense of self.
- Gabriella Coleman is an American anthropologist concerned with the politics, ethics, and culture of hacking and online activism. Coleman’s most notable ethnography features the hacktivist collective Anonymous, where she argues that various genres of hacking exist according to the social conditions at play. Coleman is dedicated to making her ethnography accessible to a diverse audience, including academics and non-academics.
- Diana E. Forsythe was an American anthropologist of science and technology and the author of the essays featured in Studying Those Who Study Us: An Anthropologist in the World of Artificial Intelligence. She asked relevant questions such as how should humans interact with computers and how gender roles are maintained in technology-oriented occupations.
- Heather Horst is a sociocultural anthropologist interested in the relationship between digital social relations and material culture.
- Mizuko Ito is a Japanese cultural anthropologist specializing in technology use and the intersection between computers and the social sciences. Her primary interest is in how young people utilize media technology and how it can be used to engage students in education.
- Daniel Miller is an anthropologist with a concentration in digital anthropology. His research includes the smartphone and perpetual opportunism, the intent and consequences of posting on social media in various geographical locations, and how hospice patients use media to socialize in the last stage of their lives.
- Mike Wesch is a cultural anthropologist interested in how people share their lives, cultures, and beliefs through digital media.

== See also ==
- Sociology of the Internet
- List of important publications in anthropology
