= Off-modern =

Descriptive Word

Off-modern is a concept coined by Svetlana Boym that describes a detour into the unexplored potentials of the modern project. It recovers unforeseen pasts and ventures into the side-alleys of modern history at the margins of error of major philosophical, economic, and technological narratives of modernization and progress. Off-modern reflection involves the exploration of the lateral potentialities of the project of critical modernity. In other words, it opens into the "modernity of what if" rather than simply modernization as it is. As such, the term serves as an intervention in the larger theoretical discussion surrounding modernity, postmodernity, hypermodernity, altermodernity, late modernity, and post-postmodernism.

Boym introduced the term in her book The Future of Nostalgia (2001). The concept was further elaborated in the first decade of the 21st century in The Off-Modern Manifesto (2003–2004), the book Architecture of the Off-Modern (2008), and in her media projects "Cities in Transit", "Portable Homes", "Black Mirrors", and "Hydrant Diaspora". The manifesto circulated globally and was republished in platforms such as NeMe, Art-e-fact, and ArtMargins. The term was embraced by various artists, including the RAQs Media Collective in New Delhi, the Albanian artist Anri Sala, and the Off Modern group in South London, which has explored the idea through impromptu artistic happenings since 2008.

In The Future of Nostalgia, Boym described the concept:

The adverb off confuses our sense of direction; it makes us explore slideshadows and backalleys rather than the straight road of progress; it allows us to take a detour from the deterministic narrative of twentieth-century history. Off-modernism offered a critique of both the modern fascination with newness and no less modern reinvention of tradition. In the off-modern tradition, reflection and longing, estrangement and affection go together.

== Selected bibliography ==
- Boym, Svetlana (2001). The Future of Nostalgia. Basic Books.
- Boym, Svetlana (2008). Architecture of the Off-Modern. Princeton Architectural Press.
- Boym, Svetlana (2010). Another Freedom: The Alternative History of an Idea. The University of Chicago Press.
