= Individualization =

Individualization may refer to:

- discrimination or perception of the individual within a group or species
  - identification in forensics and intelligence
- the development of individual traits
  - a central concept in the philosophy of C. G. Jung on personal development, under the term individuation
  - in sociology and political theory, a process towards individualism (so in Hans T. Blokland, Georg Simmel, Ferdinand Tönnies)
  - in recent sociology (Ulrich Beck and Elisabeth Beck-Gernsheim, Zygmunt Bauman) the consequence of social changes in late modernity, in which individuals are increasingly required to construct their own lives
- in economics, separate taxation of married couples
- personalization; using technology to accommodate the differences between individuals
- Personalized learning

== See also ==
- Individuation
