= Reflexive modernization =

Concept

The concept of reflexive modernization or reflexive modernity was launched by a joint effort of three of the leading European sociologists: Anthony Giddens, Ulrich Beck and Scott Lash. The introduction of this concept served a double purpose: to reassess sociology as a science of the present (moving beyond the early-20th-century conceptual framework), and to provide a counterbalance to the postmodernist paradigm offering a re-constructive view alongside deconstruction.

The concept built upon previous notions such as post-industrial society (Daniel Bell) and postmaterial society, but stresses how in reflexive modernization, modernity directs its attention to the process of modernization itself.

== Completion of modernity ==
The main thesis deals with the changes brought on by the realization of modernity's ideals, such as universal suffrage and education, the welfare state, civil and political rights, changes that marked the shift to the second modernity. The authors consider it a reflexive modernity because it opposes its earlier version, in the same way as the first modernity opposed feudal traditionalism. As a consequence, the institutions of the first modernity are beginning to crumble in the face of economic and cultural globalization. The state is starting to lose its importance with the rise of transnational forces (corporations, NGOs), the family is splitting apart with rising divorce rates favoured by the flexibility of work and the women's liberation, losing its supportive function in the process, religion is reduced to a cultural artifact, traditional political action is boycotted because of a lack of identification with the parties' goals. Therefore all previous sources of solidarity lose momentum with the rise of individualization.

== Consequences ==
Ulrich Beck focuses on the dissolution of traditional institutions and the rise of transnational forces, while promoting a new type solidarity in the face of the human made dangers of the risk society, exacerbated by the inherent limits being discovered to all forms of social knowing. Anthony Giddens proposes a third way of social policies aimed at tackling the new challenges to identity and life choices created by the biographical risks and uncertainties of reflexive modernity. Zygmunt Bauman talks about the social effects of globalization, as it seems to create new divisions between the people connected to the global flux of information (the "tourists") and those excluded from them, not needed as workforce anymore (the "bums").

Ronald Inglehart studies the shift of human values from material to post-material in the Western societies by analysing the World Values Survey databases; and Pippa Norris stresses the importance of cultural globalization over economical globalization, while also talking about the new divisions, such as the digital divide.

== Characteristics ==
Reflexive modernization is a process of modernization that is characteristic of risk society whereby progress is achieved through reorganization and "reform". Science and technology as it is used for the purpose of reflexive modernization is less concerned with expanding the resource base, but rather with re-evaluating that which is already being used by society. There is a constant flow of information between science and industry, and progress is achieved through the resulting reforms, optimizations and adaptations. Examples of reflexive modernization that have recently gained political momentum are sustainability and the precautionary principle. The new social movements (feminist, green, and pirate parties) are also considered to be an expression of reflexive modernization.

== See also ==
- Jean Baudrillard
- Ecological modernization
- Liquid modernity
- Jean-François Lyotard
- Post-structuralism
- Unintended consequences
