= Wien Haidestraße railway station =

Railway station in Vienna, Austria

Wien Haidestraße
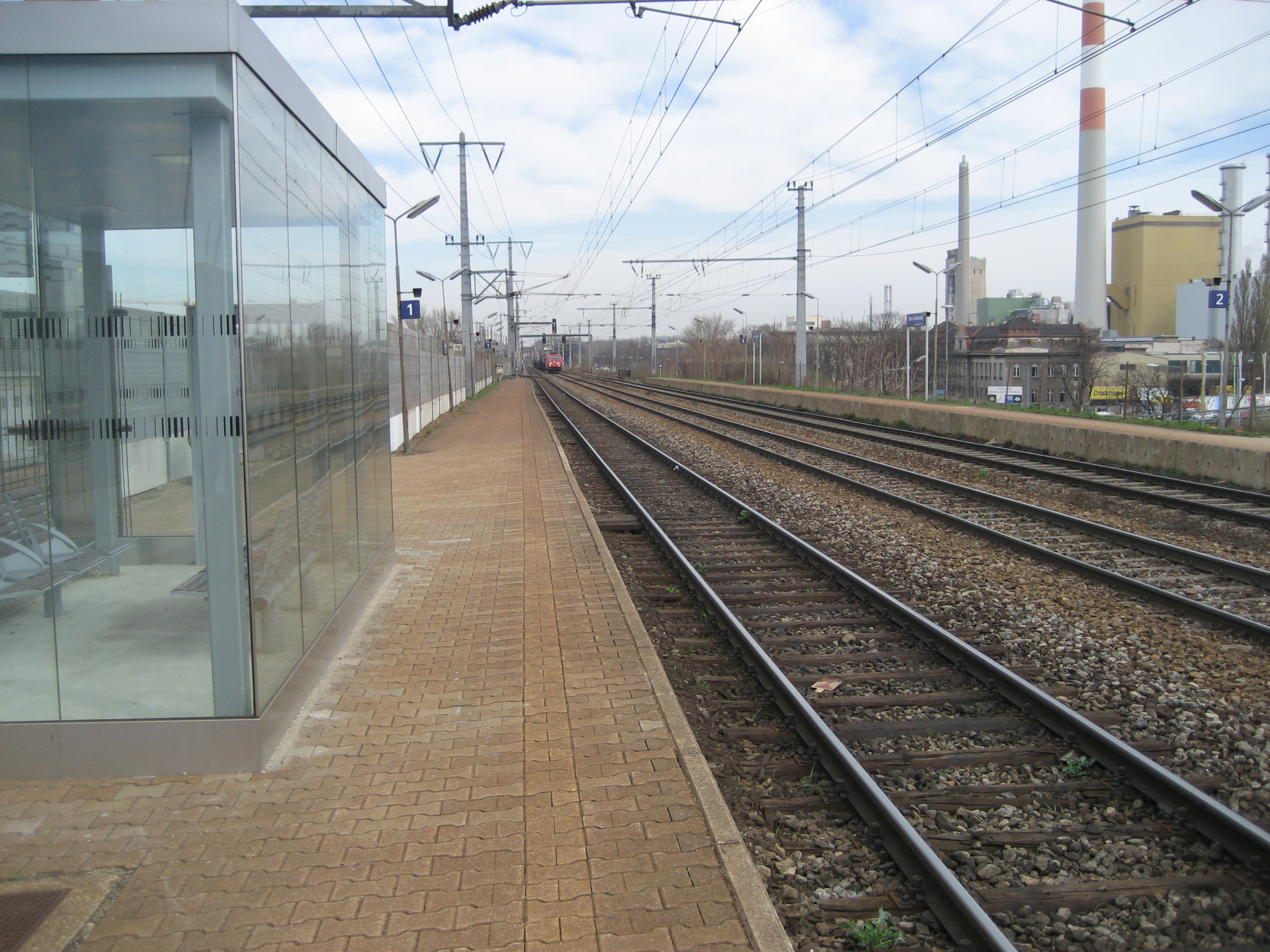
- The station platforms in 2010

General information
- Location: Haidestraße 1 Vienna; Austria
- Coordinates: 48°10′42″N 16°25′34″E
- Owner: ÖBB
- Line: Laaer Ostbahn
- Platforms: 2 side platforms
- Tracks: 2
- Train operators: ÖBB

Services
Preceding station	Vienna S-Bahn	Following station
Wien Simmering towards Wien Hütteldorf	S80	Wien Praterkai towards Wien Aspern Nord
Location

Wien Haidestraße is a railway station serving Simmering, the eleventh district of Vienna.

== Services ==
As of the December 2020 timetable change, the following services stop at Wien Haidestraße:

- Vienna S-Bahn S80: half-hourly service between Wien Hütteldorf and Wien Aspern Nord.
