= Individual (disambiguation) =

Individual is a person or any specific object in a group of things.

Individual, Individualism or Individuality may also refer to:

== Philosophy ==
- Individualism, a moral, political, or social outlook, that stresses human independence and the importance of individual self-reliance and liberty
  - Individualist anarchism, holds that individual conscience and the pursuit of self-interest should not be constrained by any collective body or public authority
  - Individualist feminism, also known as libertarian feminism or ifeminism
  - Methodological individualism, a philosophical method aimed at explaining and understanding broad society
- The Individual, the journal of the Society for Individual Freedom
- Individual rights, liberal concept of rights distinct from civil rights, legal rights, and group rights
- Individual capacity, in law, one's status as a natural person, distinct from any other role
- Atomism (social), the belief that society should be viewed in terms of the individual's importance and that society is artificially constructed
- Individuals, a book by P. F. Strawson

== Music ==
- Individuals (album), a 1982 album by Sunnyboys
- The Individualist, a 1995 album by Todd Rundgren, under the pseudonym "TR-i"
- Individual (EP), a 2018 EP by Niki and Gabi
- "Individual", a song by Bad Religion on the 1994 album Stranger Than Fiction
- "The Individual", a song by Spiritualized on the 1997 album Ladies and Gentlemen We Are Floating in Space
- "Individuality", a song by The Screaming Jets on the 2000 album Scam

== Other ==
- Individual (statistics), also known as a unit of observation, is a unit described by given data
- Individual Computers, German retrocomputing hardware company
- Individual sport, as opposed to a team sport

== See also ==
- Individualization (disambiguation)
