= Alexander Schukoff =

Austrian film director and film producer

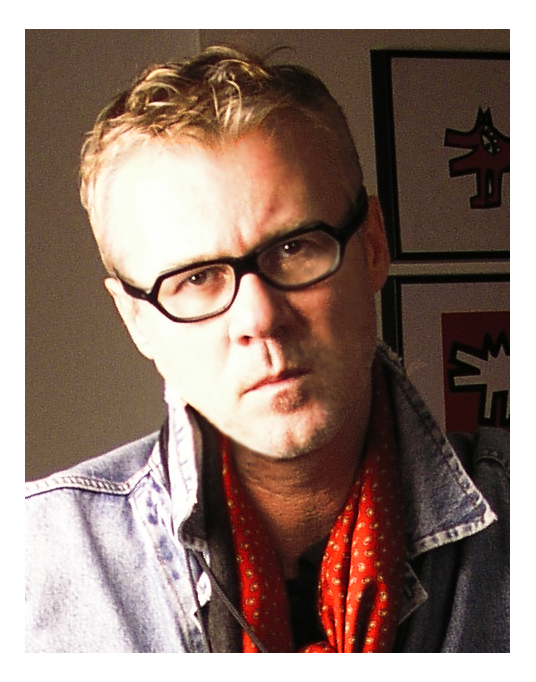
Alexander Schukoff

Alexander Schukoff (born August 23, 1956 in Graz) is an Austrian film director, film producer and video artist.

== Life and career ==
Alexander Schukoff studied directing under Axel Corti and screenwriting under Harald Zusanek at the Film Academy in Vienna. He produced short films for the movies and worked as a director for various television stations, and music videos, including those featuring Falco, and was involved in the development of the OTS-project, which later became 3sat.

In 1986, Schukoff founded his film production company, which produced commissioned work in the cultural and culinary sectors. As a media artist, he created several acclaimed short films for the cinema, with his first feature film "Simmering" still being screened in theaters and at festivals today, as well as video installations in museums such as Museum of Applied Arts and Kunsthalle in Vienna.

Schukoff shifted his focus towards television documentaries in collaboration with journalist Nadeschda Tschistjakowa. Since 2005, in association with ORF the duo produced many documentaries, that have been shown worldwide on various television networks and have won multiple international film awards.

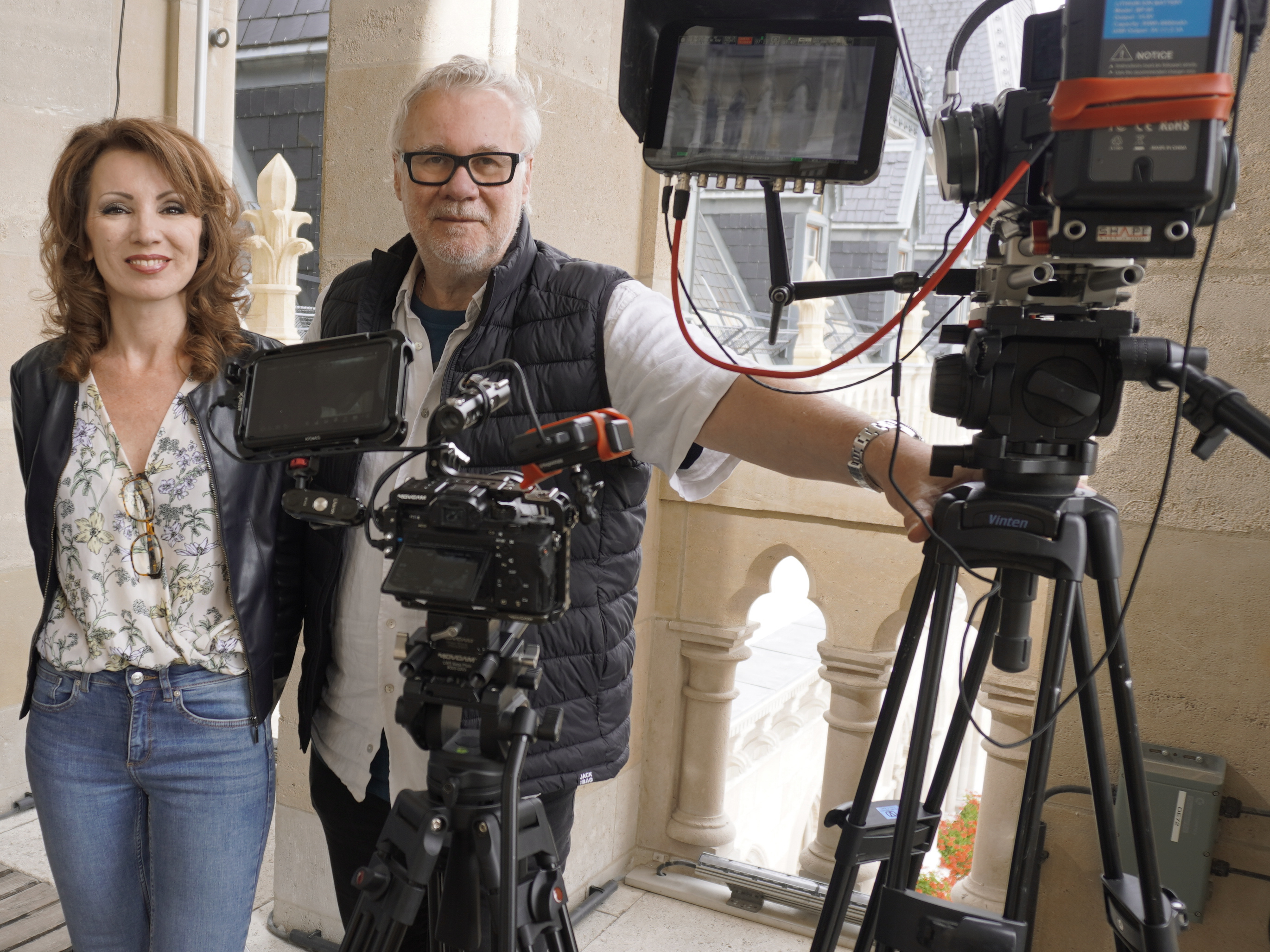
Nadeschda and Alexander Schukoff, Vienna City Hall 2024

Since 2007, Alexander Schukoff has been married to his partner Nadeschda Schukoff (maiden name Tschistjakowa). Together, they have a daughter and reside in Vienna.

== Filmography and video installations (selection) ==
- 1978: Simmering, short movie. Excerpts from this film were also used in the video installation "Remembering Forgetting" by Harvard Professor Svetlana Boyms about her escape via Simmering (Vienna) from the Soviet Union in 1981, which was screened at Harvard University at 2015.
- 1981: M.O. Music Show, TV-musicshow
- 2003: About Ingeborg Bachmann, Live-Video-Performance at Museum of Applied Arts, Vienna
- 2005: Superstars. From Warhol to Madonna, Videoinstallation at Kunsthalle Wien
- 2008: Coffee Express, TV broadcast,
- 2010: The Vienna Roll – A little Cultural History, TV-documentary, 45 mins
- 2017: Goldsmiths of the Habsburgs, TV-documentary
- 2017: Sound of Vienna, TV-documentary. In close collaboration with Gregor Widholm and his scientific findings on the causes of the unique sound of Viennese orchestras.
- 2020: The Art of Soap Making, TV-documentary. For this film director Alexander Schukoff, was awarded the Silver Award in the category of "Sustainable Producing and Circular Economy" at the Deauville Green Awards Film Festival 2021.
- 2021: Christmas Baking In Vienna, TV-documentary about Christmas traditions of Viennese confectioner. Director Alexander Schukoff wins the Silver Award at Deauville Green Awards 2023.
- 2022: Festive Treats of Viennese Cuisine, TV-documentary
- 2024 From Black To Green - A Chimney Sweeps Journey, TV-documentary,
- 2025: Behind the Facades of the Vienna City Hall, TV-documentary,

== Awards ==
- Winner of the Silver Award at Deauville Green Awards 2021 for "The Art of Soap Making"
- Nominated for the Finalistes at Deauville Green Awards 2023 for "Christmas Baking in Vienna"
- Winner Silver Award for "Christmas Baking in Vienna" in category ecotourism and sustainable travel at Deauville Green Awards 2023.
- Winner US-International Awards 2024 for "Festive Treats of The Viennese Cuisine" in category "Culture and Lifestyle"
- Winner US-International Awards 2024 for "Christmas Baking in Vienna" in category "Travel and Eco Tourism"
- Winner US-International Awards 2025 for "From Back to Green - A chimey Sweeps Journey" in category "Environment, Ecology & Sustainability"
- Winner US-International Awards 2025 for "From Back to Green - A chimey Sweeps Journey" in category "Safety"
- Winner Deauvillegreenawards 2026 for "The Scent from the Alps" in catogery Conscious consumption and eco-labels
- Gold Award 2026 in Los Angeles 2026 for "Behind the Facades of Vienna City Hall"
