= Postmodernity =

Societal state after modernity

Postmodernity (post-modernity or the postmodern condition) is the economic or cultural state or condition of society which is said to exist after modernity. (Note: In this context, "modern" is not used in the sense of "contemporary", but as a name for a specific period in history.) The idea of the postmodern condition is sometimes characterized as a culture stripped of its capacity to function in any linear or autonomous state like regressive isolationism, as opposed to the progressive mind state of modernism.

Postmodernity can mean a personal response to a postmodern society, the conditions in a society which make it postmodern or the state of being that is associated with a postmodern society as well as a historical epoch. In most contexts it should be distinguished from postmodernism, the adoption of postmodern philosophies or traits in the arts, culture and society. In fact, today's historical perspectives on the developments of postmodern art (postmodernism) and postmodern society (postmodernity) can be best described as two umbrella terms for processes engaged in an ongoing dialectical relationship like post-postmodernism, the result of which is the evolving culture of the contemporary world.

Some commentators deny that modernity ended, and consider the post-WWII era to be a continuation of modernity, which they refer to as late modernity.

== Uses of the term ==
Postmodernity is the state or condition of being postmodern – after or in reaction to that which is modern, as in postmodern art (see postmodernism). Modernity is defined as a period or condition loosely identified with the Progressive Era, the Industrial Revolution, or the Enlightenment. In philosophy and critical theory postmodernity refers to the state or condition of society which is said to exist after modernity, a historical condition that marks the reasons for the end of modernity. This usage is ascribed to the philosophers Jean-François Lyotard and Jean Baudrillard.

One "project" of modernity is said by Jürgen Habermas to have been the fostering of progress by incorporating principles of rationality and hierarchy into public and artistic life. (See also post-industrial, Information Age) Lyotard understood modernity as a cultural condition characterized by constant change in the pursuit of progress. Postmodernity then represents the culmination of this process where constant change has become the status quo and the notion of progress obsolete. Following Ludwig Wittgenstein's critique of the possibility of absolute and total knowledge, Lyotard further argued that the various metanarratives of progress such as positivist science, Marxism, and structuralism were defunct as methods of achieving progress.

The literary critic Fredric Jameson and the geographer David Harvey have identified postmodernity with "late capitalism" or "flexible accumulation", a stage of capitalism following finance capitalism, characterised by highly mobile labor and capital and what Harvey called "time and space compression". They suggest that this coincides with the breakdown of the Bretton Woods system which, they believe, defined the economic order following the Second World War. (See also consumerism, critical theory.) Other academics, such as the archaeologist Artur Ribeiro, also identify postmodernity with late capitalism. Though in the case of Ribeiro, he places the start of modernity at the beginning of the Bretton Woods system.

Those who generally view modernity as obsolete or an outright failure, a flaw in humanity's evolution leading to disasters like Auschwitz and Hiroshima, see postmodernity as a positive development. Other philosophers, particularly those seeing themselves as within the Modern Project, see the state of postmodernity as a negative consequence of holding postmodernist ideas. For example, Jürgen Habermas and others contend that postmodernity represents a resurgence of long running Counter-Enlightenment ideas, that the modern project is not finished and that universality cannot be so lightly dispensed with. Postmodernity, the consequence of holding postmodern ideas, is generally a negative term in this context.

== Postmodernism ==
Postmodernity is a condition or a state of being associated with changes to institutions and creations and with social and political results and innovations, globally but especially in the West since the 1950s, whereas postmodernism is an aesthetic, literary, political or social philosophy, the "cultural and intellectual phenomenon", especially since the 1920s' new movements in the arts. Both of these terms are used by philosophers, social scientists and social critics to refer to aspects of contemporary culture, economics and society that are the result of features of late 20th century and early 21st century life, including the fragmentation of authority and the commoditization of knowledge (see "Modernity").

The relationship between postmodernity and critical theory, sociology and philosophy is fiercely contested. The terms "postmodernity" and "postmodernism" are often hard to distinguish, the former being often the result of the latter. The period has had diverse political ramifications: its "anti-ideological ideas" appear to have been associated with the feminist movement, racial equality movements, LGBT movements, most forms of late 20th century anarchism and even the peace movement as well as various hybrids of these in the current anti-globalization movement. Though none of these institutions entirely embraces all aspects of the postmodern movement in its most concentrated definition they all reflect, or borrow from, some of its core ideas.

== History ==
Some authors, such as Lyotard and Baudrillard, believe that modernity ended in the late 20th century and thus have defined a period subsequent to modernity, namely postmodernity, while others, such as Zygmunt Bauman and Anthony Giddens, would extend modernity to cover the developments denoted by postmodernity. Others still contend that modernity ended with the Victorian Age at the turn of the 20th century.

Postmodernity has gone through two relatively distinct phases: the first beginning in the late 1940s and 1950s and ending with the Cold War (when analog media with limited bandwidth encouraged a few, authoritative media channels), and the second beginning at the end of the Cold War (marked by the spread of cable television and "new media" based on digital means of information dissemination and broadcast).

The first phase of postmodernity overlaps the end of modernity and is part of the modern period (see lumpers/splitters, periodization). Television became the primary news source, manufacturing decreased in importance in the economies of Western Europe and the United States but trade volumes increased within the developed core. In 1967–1969 a crucial cultural explosion took place within the developed world as the baby boom generation, which had grown up with postmodernity as its fundamental experience of society, demanded entrance into the political, cultural and educational power structure. A series of demonstrations and acts of rebellion – ranging from nonviolent and cultural, through violent acts of terrorism – represented the opposition of the young to the policies and perspectives of the previous age. Opposition to the Algerian War and the Vietnam War, to laws allowing or encouraging racial segregation and to laws which overtly discriminated against women and restricted access to divorce, increased use of marijuana and psychedelics, the emergence of pop cultural styles of music and drama, including rock music and the ubiquity of stereo, television and radio helped make these changes visible in the broader cultural context. This period is associated with the work of Marshall McLuhan, a philosopher who focused on the results of living in a media culture and argued that participation in a mass media culture both overshadows actual content disseminated and is liberating because it loosens the authority of local social normative standards.

The second phase of postmodernity is "digitality" – the increasing power of personal and digital means of communication including fax machines, modems, cable and high speed internet, which has altered the condition of postmodernity dramatically: digital production of information allows individuals to manipulate virtually every aspect of the media environment. This has brought producers into conflict with consumers over intellectual capital and intellectual property and led to the creation of a new economy whose supporters argue that the dramatic fall in information costs will alter society fundamentally.

Digitality, or what Esther Dyson referred to as "being digital", emerged as a separate condition from postmodernity. The ability to manipulate items of popular culture, the World Wide Web, the use of search engines to index knowledge, and telecommunications were producing a "convergence" marked by the rise of "participatory culture" in the words of Henry Jenkins.

One demarcation point of this era is the liberalization of China in the early 1980s and the collapse of the Soviet Union in 1991. Francis Fukuyama wrote "The End of History?" in 1989 in anticipation of the Fall of the Berlin Wall. He predicted that the question of political philosophy had been answered, that large-scale wars over fundamental values would no longer arise since "all prior contradictions are resolved and all human needs satisfied." This is a kind of 'endism' also taken up by Arthur Danto, who in 1964 acclaimed that Andy Warhol's Brillo Boxes asked the right question of art and hence art had ended.

== Descriptions ==
=== Distinctions in philosophy and critical theory ===
The debate on postmodernity has two distinct elements that are often confused; (1) the nature of contemporary society and (2) the nature of the critique of contemporary society. The first of these elements is concerned with the nature of changes that took place during the late 20th century. There are three principal analyses. Theorists such as Alex Callinicos and Craig Calhoun offer a conservative position on the nature of contemporary society, downplaying the significance and extent of socio-economic changes and emphasizing a continuity with the past. Secondly, a range of theorists have tried to analyze the present as a development of the "modern" project into a second, distinct phase that is nevertheless still "modernity": this has been termed the "second" or "risk" society by Ulrich Beck, "late" or "high" modernity by Giddens, "liquid" modernity by Bauman, and the "network" society by Manuel Castells. Third are those who argue that contemporary society has moved into a literally post-modern phase distinct from modernity. The most prominent proponents of this position are Lyotard and Baudrillard.

Another set of issues concerns the nature of critique, often replaying debates over (what can be crudely termed) universalism and relativism, where modernism is seen to represent the former and postmodernity the latter. Seyla Benhabib and Judith Butler pursue this debate in relation to feminist politics, Benhabib arguing that postmodern critique comprises three main elements; an anti-foundationalist concept of the subject and identity, the death of history and of notions of teleology and progress, and the death of metaphysics defined as the search for objective truth. Benhabib argues forcefully against these critical positions, holding that they undermine the bases upon which feminist politics can be founded, removing the possibility of agency, the sense of self-hood and the appropriation of women's history in the name of an emancipated future. The denial of normative ideals removes the possibility for utopia, central for ethical thinking and democratic action.

Butler responds to Benhabib by arguing that her use of postmodernism is an expression of a wider paranoia over anti-foundationalist philosophy, in particular, post-structuralism.

A number of positions are ascribed to postmodernism – Discourse is all there is, as if discourse were some kind of monistic stuff out of which all things are composed; the subject is dead, I can never say "I" again; there is no reality, only representation. These characterizations are variously imputed to postmodernism or poststructuralism, which are conflated with each other and sometimes conflated with deconstruction, and understood as an indiscriminate assemblage of French feminism, deconstruction, Lacanian psychoanalysis, Foucauldian analysis, Rorty's conversationalism, and cultural studies ... In reality, these movements are opposed: Lacanian psychoanalysis in France positions itself officially against poststructuralism, that Foucauldian rarely relate to Derridideans ... Lyotard champions the term, but he cannot be made into the example of what all the rest of the purported postmodernists are doing. Lyotard's work is, for instance, seriously at odds with that of Derrida

Butler uses the debate over the nature of the post-modernist critique to demonstrate how philosophy is implicated in power relationships and defends poststructuralist critique by arguing that the critique of the subject itself is the beginning of analysis, not the end, because the first task of enquiry is the questioning of accepted "universal" and "objective" norms.

The Benhabib-Butler debate demonstrates that there is no simple definition of a postmodern theorist as the very definition of postmodernity itself is contested. Michel Foucault rejected the label of postmodernism explicitly in interviews yet is seen by many, such as Benhabib, as advocating a form of critique that is "postmodern" in that it breaks with utopian and transcendental "modern" critiques by calling universal norms of the Enlightenment into question. Giddens rejects this characterisation of "modern critique", pointing out that a critique of Enlightenment universals was central to philosophers of the modern period, most notably Nietzsche.

=== Postmodern society ===
Jameson views a number of phenomena as distinguishing postmodernity from modernity. He speaks of "a new kind of superficiality" or "depthlessness" in which models that once explained people and things in terms of an "inside" and an "outside" (such as hermeneutics, the dialectic, Freudian repression, the existentialist distinction between authenticity and inauthenticity, and the semiotic distinction of signifier and signified) have been rejected. In a word, Structuralism has been rejected.

Second is a rejection of the modernist "Utopian gesture", evident in Van Gogh, of the transformation through art of misery into beauty whereas in the postmodernism movement the object world has undergone a "fundamental mutation" so that it has "now become a set of texts or simulacra". Whereas modernist art sought to redeem and sacralize the world, to give life to world (we might say, following Graff, to give the world back the enchantment that science and the decline of religion had taken away from it), postmodernist art bestows upon the world a "deathly quality… whose glacéd X-ray elegance mortifies the reified eye of the viewer in a way that would seem to have nothing to do with death or the death obsession or the death anxiety on the level of content" (ibid.). Graff sees the origins of this transformative mission of art in an attempted substitution of art for religion in giving meaning to the world that the rise of science and Enlightenment rationality had removed – but in the postmodern period this is seen as futile.

The third feature of the postmodern age that Jameson identifies is the "waning of affect" – not that all emotion has disappeared from the postmodern age but that it lacks a particular kind of emotion such as that found in "Rimbaud's magical flowers 'that look back at you'". He notes that "pastiche eclipses parody" as "the increasing unavailability of the personal style" leads to pastiche becoming a universal practice.

Jameson argues that distance "has been abolished" in postmodernity, that we "are submerged in its henceforth filled and suffused volumes to the point where our now postmodern bodies are bereft of spatial co-ordinates". This "new global space" constitutes postmodernity's "moment of truth". The various other features of the postmodern that he identifies "can all now be seen as themselves partial (yet constitutive) aspects of the same general spatial object". The postmodern era has seen a change in the social function of culture. He identifies culture in the modern age as having had a property of "semi-autonomy", with an "existence… above the practical world of the existent" but, in the postmodern age, culture has been deprived of this autonomy, the cultural has expanded to consume the entire social realm so that all becomes "cultural". "Critical distance", the assumption that culture can be positioned outside "the massive Being of capital" upon which left-wing theories of cultural politics are dependent, has become outmoded. The "prodigious new expansion of multinational capital ends up penetrating and colonizing those very pre-capitalist enclaves (Nature and the Unconscious) which offered extraterritorial and Archimedean footholds for critical effectivity".

=== Social sciences ===
Postmodern sociology can be said to focus on conditions of life which became increasingly prevalent in the late 20th century in the most industrialized nations, including the ubiquity of mass media and mass production, the rise of a global economy and a shift from manufacturing to service economies. Jameson and Harvey described it as consumerism, where manufacturing, distribution and dissemination have become exceptionally inexpensive but social connectedness and community have become rarer. Other thinkers assert that postmodernity is the natural reaction to mass broadcasting in a society conditioned to mass production and mass politics. The work of Alasdair MacIntyre informs the versions of postmodernism elaborated by such authors as Murphy (2003) and Bielskis (2005), for whom MacIntyre's postmodern revision of Aristotelianism poses a challenge to the kind of consumerist ideology that now promotes capital accumulation.

The sociological view of postmodernity ascribes it to more rapid transportation, wider communication and the ability to abandon standardization of mass production, leading to a system which values a wider range of capital than previously and allows value to be stored in a greater variety of forms. Harvey argues that postmodernity is an escape from "Fordism", a term coined by Antonio Gramsci to describe the mode of industrial regulation and accumulation which prevailed during the Keynesian era of economic policy in OECD countries from the early 1930s to the 1970s. Fordism for Harvey is associated with Keynesianism in that the first concerns methods of production and capital-labor relations while the latter concerns economic policy and regulation. Post-Fordism is therefore one of the basic aspects of postmodernity from Harvey's point of view.

Artifacts of postmodernity include the dominance of television and popular culture, the wide accessibility of information and mass telecommunications. Postmodernity also exhibits a greater resistance to making sacrifices in the name of progress discernible in environmentalism and the growing importance of the anti-war movement. Postmodernity in the industrialised core is marked by increasing focus on civil rights and equal opportunity as well as movements such as feminism and multiculturalism and the backlash against these movements. The postmodern political sphere is marked by multiple arenas and possibilities of citizenship and political action concerning various forms of struggle against oppression or alienation (in collectives defined by sex or ethnicity) while the modernist political arena remains restricted to class struggle.

Theorists such as Michel Maffesoli believe that postmodernity is corroding the circumstances that provide for its subsistence and will eventually result in a decline of individualism and the birth of a new neo-Tribal era.

According to theories of postmodernity, economic and technological conditions of our age have given rise to a decentralized, media-dominated society in which ideas are only simulacra, inter-referential representations and copies of each other with no real, original, stable or objective source of communication and meaning. Globalization, brought on by innovations in communication, manufacturing and transportation is often cited as one force which has driven the decentralized modern life, creating a culturally pluralistic and interconnected global society lacking any single dominant center of political power, communication or intellectual production. The postmodernist view is that intersubjective, not objective, knowledge will be the dominant form of discourse under such conditions and that ubiquity of dissemination fundamentally alters the relationship between reader and that which is read, between observer and the observed, between those who consume and those who produce.

=== Postmodernity as a shift of epistemology ===
Another conception of postmodernity is as an epistemological shift. This perspective suggests that the way people communicate and justify knowledge (i.e. epistemology) changes in conjunction with other societal changes, that the cultural and technological changes of the 1960s and 1970s included such a shift, and that this shift should be denoted as from modernity to postmodernity. [See French (2016), French & Ehrman (2016), or Sørensen (2007)].

== Criticisms ==
Criticisms of the postmodern condition can broadly be put into four categories: criticisms of postmodernity from the perspective of those who reject modernism and its offshoots, criticisms from supporters of modernism who believe that postmodernity lacks crucial characteristics of the modern project, critics from within postmodernity who seek reform or change based on their understanding of postmodernism, and those who believe that postmodernity is a passing, and not a growing, phase in social organization.

== See also ==
- Continuity thesis – Hypothesis regarding European intellectual history
- Futurism – Artistic and social movement
- Hauntology – Return or persistence of past ideas
- Hypermodernity – Stage of society in postmodernism
- Intellectualism – Mental perspective
- Late modernity – Sociological concept
- Modern era – Current period of history
- Post-industrial society – Service and knowledge-based society
- Post-materialism
- Post-postmodernism – Artistic and philosophical movement
- Post-Western era – Conjectured era without Western dominance
- Postmodern philosophy – Philosophical movement
- Postmodernism – Artistic, cultural, and theoretical movement
- Postmodernism: The absent father
- Second modernity – Industrial society transformed into a more reflexive network society or information society

== Sources ==
- Anderson, Perry (1998). The Origins of Postmodernity. London: Verso.
- Deely, John (2001). Four Ages of Understanding: The First Postmodern Survey of Philosophy from ancient Times to the Turn of the Twenty-first Century. Toronto: University of Toronto Press.
- Guénon, René (1927). The Crisis of the Modern World. Hillsdale: Sophia Perennis.
- Guénon, René (1945). The Reign of Quantity & the Signs of the Times. Hillsdale: Sophia Perennis.
- Harvey, David (1990). The Condition of Postmodernity. An enquiry into the origins of cultural change. Oxford: Blackwell.
- Ihab Hassan (2000), From Postmodernism to Postmodernity: the Local/Global Context, text online.
- Jean-François Lyotard (1924–1998) was a French philosopher and literary theorist well known for his embracing of postmodernism after the late 1970s. He published "La Condition postmoderne: Rapport sur le savoir" (The Postmodern Condition: A Report on Knowledge) (1979)
- Charles Arthur Willard. Liberalism and the Problem of Knowledge: A New Rhetoric for Modern Democracy. University of Chicago Press. (1996).
