= Second modernity =

Transformation into information society

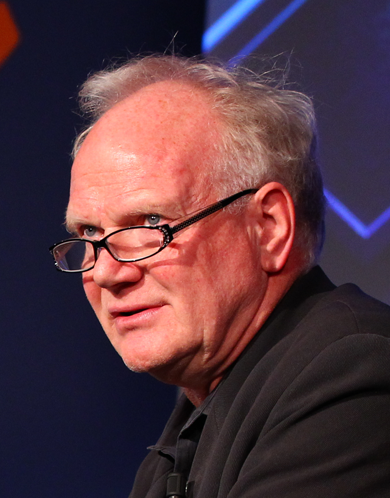
Ulrich Beck in 2012

Second modernity (German: Zweite Moderne) is a phrase coined by the German sociologist Ulrich Beck, and is his word for the period after modernity.

Where modernity broke down agricultural society in favour of industrial society, second modernity transforms industrial society into a new and more reflexive network society or information society.

== Risk society ==
Second modernity is marked by a new awareness of the risks — risks to all forms of life, plant, animal and human — created by the very successes of modernity in tackling the problem of human scarcity. Systems that previously seemed to offer protection from risks both natural and social are increasingly recognised as producing new man-made risks on a global scale as a byproduct of their functioning. Such systems become part of the problem, not the solution. Modernisation and information advances themselves create new social dangers, such as cybercrime, while scientific advances open up new areas, like cloning or genetic modification, where decisions are necessarily made without adequate capacity to assess longterm consequences.

Recognising the fresh dilemmas created by this reflexive modernization, Beck has suggested a new "cosmopolitan Realpolitik" to overcome the difficulties of a world in which national interests can no longer be promoted effectively at the national level alone.

== Knowledge society ==
Second modernity has also been linked to the so-called knowledge society, marked by a pluralisation of different types of knowledge. It is characterised in particular by knowledge-dependent risks — the uncertainties manufactured by the information world itself.

== Resistance ==
Various forms of resistance to second modernity have emerged, among them, for example, Euroscepticism.

Beck sees al-Qaeda as a by-product of, as well as resistance to, second modernity, not only in its use of information-technology tools, but also in its syncretist ideology.

== See also ==
- Late modernity
- Postmodernity
- Post-normal science
- Great Recession, often seen as a failure of modern capitalism
- Nanotechnology, a possible second Industrial Revolution
- Bruno Latour

== Sources ==
- Allan, Stuart; Adam, Barbara; and Carter, Cynthia (eds.). 1999. Environmental Risks and the Media. London and New York: Routledge. ISBN 9780415214469 (cloth); ISBN 9780415214476 (pbk); ISBN 9780203164990 (e-book).
- Beck, Ulrich. 2006. The Cosmopolitan Vision, translated by Ciaran Cronin. Cambridge, UK; Malden, MA: Polity Press. ISBN 0-7456-3398-6 (cloth); ISBN 0-7456-3399-4 (pbk).
- Carrier, Martin; and Nordmann, Alfred. 2011. Science in the Context of Application. Dordrecht, London, and New York: Springer. ISBN 9789048190508.
- Harding, Sandra G. 2008. Sciences from Below: Feminisms, Postcolonialities, and Modernities. Next Wave. Durham: Duke University Press. ISBN 9780822342595 (cloth); ISBN 9780822342823 (pbk).
- He, Chuanqi. 2012. Modernization Science: The Principles and Methods of National Advancement. Berlin and New York: Springer Verlag. ISBN 9783642254581 (cloth); ISBN 9783642254598 (ebook).
- Marchetti, Raffaele; and Vidović, Davorka (eds.). 2010. European Union and Global Democracy. Zagreb: CPI [Centar za Politološka Istraživanja]/PSRC [Political Science Research Center]. ISBN 9789537022211.
