= Scott Lash =

British sociologist

Scott Lash (born December 23, 1945) is a professor of sociology and cultural studies at Goldsmiths, University of London. Lash obtained a BSc in psychology from the University of Michigan, an MA in sociology from Northwestern University, and a PhD from the London School of Economics (1980). Lash began his teaching career as a lecturer at Lancaster University and became a professor in 1993. He moved to London in 1998 to take up his present post as Director for the Centre for Cultural Studies and Professor of Sociology at Goldsmiths College.

Lash's work has been influential in sociology and cultural studies, he has been interviewed by numerous media outlets and other academics, including the BBC Radio's Essay and in Design and Culture. He has been an editor of the journal Theory, Culture and Society since 1989. His work with co-author John Urry has received a great deal of attention in cultural geography and Gibson Burrell stated their work "their book (The End of Organised Capitalism) was a huge achievement in the ‘assemblage’ of material, and 25 years of ‘events’ have not been too unkind to it." His works have been translated to 15 languages, and he has directed research projects in the domain of technology and media since 1996.

== Works ==
Scott Lash has made significant contributions to the sociological understanding of postmodernism, particularly through his concept of de-differentiation. While broadly sympathetic to Marxian interpretations, Lash adopts an eclectic approach that incorporates insights from classical theorists such as Max Weber and Émile Durkheim. He argues that modernity was marked by a process of differentiation, involving the separation of various spheres of social life—such as culture, economy, and politics—and distinctions within culture itself, such as those between religion and secularism, art and science, or aesthetics and morality. In contrast, Lash views postmodernism as a critique of modernity characterized by de-differentiation: the boundaries between different domains of social and cultural life are dissolving, distinctions between high and low culture are blurred, and academic disciplines increasingly overlap. He further suggests that we now live in a “semiotic society” where signs and spaces dominate daily life. Postmodern cultural production, according to Lash, is marked by a shift from narrative and historical depth to surface-level imagery and spectacle, resulting in what he describes as a “visual rather than a literary sensibility.” His work also builds on Walter Benjamin’s ideas, emphasizing the post-auratic nature of contemporary artworks and the destabilization of traditional notions of authorship and reality.

=== Publications ===
==== Books ====
- The Militant Worker, Class and Radicalism in France and America, London: Heinemann Educational Books, 1984.
- The End of Organized Capitalism, Cambridge: Polity Books, 1987. Co-authored with John Urry.
- Max Weber, Rationality and Modernity, London: Allen and Unwin, 1987 (Co-edited with Sam Whimster).
- Sociology of Postmodernism, London: Routledge, 1990.
- Post-Structuralist and Postmodernist Sociology, Sussex, Edward Elgar, 1991 (edited)
- Modernity and Identity, Oxford: Blackwell, 1992 (co-edited with Jonathan Friedman)
- Economies of Signs and Space, London: TCS/Sage 1994. (co-author is J Urry).
- Reflexive Modernization, Cambridge: Polity Press 1994.(co-authors Ulrich Beck and Anthony Giddens.
- Global Modernities, London: TCS/Sage, 1995 (co-ed. with M. Featherstone and R. Robertson)
- De-Traditionalization, Oxford: Blackwell, 1996 (co-ed. with P. Heelas and P. Morris)
- Risk, Environment and Modernity, London: Sage (TCS), 1996 (co-ed. with B. Szerszynski and B. Wynne )
- Time and Value, Oxford: Blackwell, 1998 (co-ed. with Andrew Quick and Richard Roberts)
- Spaces of Culture: City, Nation, World, London: Sage 1999 (co-ed. with M. Featherstone)
- Another Modernity, A Different Rationality, Oxford: Blackwell, 1999.
- Critique of Information, London: Sage, 2002. (trans. Spanish, Japanese, Chinese)
- Recognition and Difference: Politics, Identity, Multiculture (co-ed. with M. Featherstone) London: Sage, 2002.
- Global Culture Industry: The Mediation of Things, Cambridge: Polity (2007). Co-author is C. Lury.
- Intensive Culture: Social Theory, Religion & Contemporary Capitalism, London: Sage 2010.
- China Constructing Capitalism: Economic Life and Urban Change, London: Routledge, 2014 (co-authors M. Keith, J. Arnoldi, T. Rooker).
- Experience: New Foundations for the Human Sciences, Cambridge: Polity, 2018.

==== Articles ====
- “Communicative Rationality and Desire”. Telos 61 (Fall 1984). New York: Telos Press.
- "Being after Time", in S. Lash and A. Quick (eds.) Time and Value, Oxford: Blackwell, 1998, pp. 147–161. And in Cultural Values, vol. 2, nos. 2–3, June 1998, 304–318.
- "The Consequences of Reflexivity: Towards a Theory of the Object", in J. Philip (ed.) Reflexivity and Culture (London, Pluto, 1998).
- "Risk Culture", in Barbara Adam, Ulrich Beck and Joost Van Loon (eds.) The Risk Society and Beyond, London: Sage 2000, pp. 47–62. ISBN 0-7619-6468-1.
- "Informationkritik", Revista Critique des Ciencias Sociales, vol. 22., no,3.
- "Technological Forms of Life", Theory, Culture & Society, vol. 18, no.1, 2001.
- "Recognition or Difference", Theory, Culture & Society, vol. 18, no. 6, 2001.
- "From Accumulation to Circulation: Young British Art and the Culture Society", in Arturo Rodriguez Morato, The Culture Society, Barcelona, 2002.. (co-author is John Myles)
- "New Media: From Creativity to Consultancy", Environment and Planning A, vol. 22, Nov. 2002. (with Andreas Wittel).
- "Understanding New Media Objects: From Content to Connectivity", in S. Woolgar (ed.) The Virtual Society?, Oxford: Oxford University Press, 2002. (with C. Lury and A. Wittel).
- "Lebenssoziologie: Georg Simmel in the Information Age", Theory, Culture & Society, vol. 22, no. 3, 2005, 1-23.
- "Power after Hegemony: Cultural Studies in Mutation?", Theory, Culture, and Society, 24(3), 2007 :55-78.
- "In Praise of the A Posteriori: Sociology and the Empirical", "European Journal of Social Theory", vol. 12, no.1, 2009, 175–87.
- "Deforming the Figure: Topology and the Social imaginary", "Theory, Culture & Society", vol. 29, nos. 4–5, 2012, 261–287.
- "Morality and Solidarity: China's Relational Economy", in J. Koltan (ed.) Solidarity and the Crisis of Trust, Gdansk: European Solidarity Centre, 2016, pp. 121–132 (http://www.ecs.gda.pl/title,pid,1471.html).

== See also ==
- Reflexive modernization
- Late modernity
