= Svetlana Boym =

Russian-American cultural theorist and novelist (1959–2015)

- Born: 1959; Leningrad
- Died: August 5, 2015 (aged 55–56); Boston, Massachusetts, US

Academic background
- Education: Harvard University; Boston University; Herzen Pedagogical Institute

Academic work
- Discipline: comparative literature
- Main interests: cultural theory

Svetlana Boym (Russian: Светла́на Ю́рьевна Бо́йм; 1959 – August 5, 2015) was a Russian-American cultural theorist, visual and media artist, playwright and novelist. She was the Curt Hugo Reisinger Professor of Slavic and Comparative Literatures at Harvard University. She was an associate of the Graduate School of Design and Architecture at Harvard University. Much of her work focused on developing the new theoretical concept of the off-modern.

== Biography ==
Boym was born in Leningrad, USSR. She studied Spanish at the Herzen Pedagogical Institute in Leningrad. At the age of 19, she emigrated to Boston, after spending time at a refugee transit camp in Simmering, a district of Vienna. Her father subsequently lost his position as an engineer, and her parents were denied the right to leave the USSR for six years.

She received an M.A. from Boston University and a Ph.D. from Harvard in 1988. Boym died on August 5, 2015, aged 56, in Boston, Massachusetts, from cancer. She was survived by her partner, the political theorist Dana Villa.

== Writing ==
Boym's written work explored relationships between utopia and kitsch, memory and modernity, and homesickness and the sickness of home. Her research interests included 20th-century Russian literature, cultural studies, comparative literature and literary studies. In addition to teaching and writing, Boym also sat on the Editorial Collective of the interdisciplinary scholarly journal Public Culture. Boym was awarded a Guggenheim Fellowship, the Cabot Award for Research in Humanities, and an award from the American Council of Learned Societies. She won a Gilette Company Fellowship which provided her half a year study at the American Academy in Berlin.

== Reception ==
In her book Twilight of Democracy, Anne Applebaum analysing post-1989 developments in Western liberalism has made use of Boym's description of reflective vs. restorative nostalgics. Quoting from a conversation with Stathis Kalyvas, Applebaum writes: "Unity is an anomaly. Polarization is normal." This has been called the main thesis of Boym's book: Longing for the past can be prospective (restorative), too, since imagined futures depend on how we're dealing with our nostalgic homesickness. It is reminiscent of Reinhart Koselleck's principle, according to which "each present was once an imagined future".

== Artistic practice ==
In 2006, an exhibition showing Boym's media art opened in Factory Rog-Metelkovo, an art space in Ljubljana during the City of Women Festival. After that, she exhibited her work in various spaces including the Center for Book Arts in New York in 2008, and Galerija 101 in Kaunas in 2009.

She also curated the exhibit "Territories of Terror: Memories and Mythologies of Gulag in Contemporary Russian-American Art" at Boston's University Art Gallery in 2006. The exhibition featured works by Vitaly Komar, Alexander Melamid, Leonid Sokov, Grisha Bruskin, Eugene Yelchin, Irina Nakhova and Vadim Zakharov. The exhibition tackled the dual imperative of Gulag history and mythology, map and territory. Boym also edited the exhibition catalogue that accompanied the exhibition. In 2016, Boym's short film Remembering Forgetting about her emigration debuted posthumously in Vienna.

== Selected bibliography ==
=== Books ===
- Another Freedom: The Alternative History of an Idea (University of Chicago Press, 2010) ISBN 978-0-226-06973-9
- Ninotchka: A Novel (SUNY Press, 2003)
- Kosmos: Remembrances of the Future - photographs by Adam Bartos, text by Svetlana Boym (Princeton Architectural Press, 2001)
- The Future of Nostalgia (Basic Books, 2001)
- Common Places: Mythologies of Everyday Life in Russia (Harvard University Press, 1994)
- Death in Quotation Marks: Cultural Myths of the Modern Poet (Harvard University Press, 1991)

=== Articles ===
- The Off-Modern Mirror, E-flux, no. 19, October 2010.
- Scenography of Friendship, Cabinet Magazine, Issue 36: Friendship, Winter 2009/10.
- Poetics and Politics of Estrangement: Victor Shklovsky and Hannah Arendt, Poetics Today, Vol. 26, no. 4, 2005, pp. 581–611.
- Nostalgia and Its Discontents, The Hedgehog Review, Summer 2007.
- Conspiracy Theories and Literary Ethics: Umberto Eco, Danilo Kiš and the Protocols of Zion, Comparative Literature, Vol. 51, no. 2, Spring 1999, pp. 97–122.
- On Diasporic Intimacy: Ilya Kabakov's Installations and Immigrant Homes, Critical Inquiry, Vol. 24, no. 2, Winter 1998, pp. 498–524.
- Estrangement as a Lifestyle: Shklovsky and Brodsky, Poetics Today, Vol. 17, No. 14, Winter 1996, pp. 511–530.
- From the Russian Soul to Post-Communist Nostalgia, Representations, Vol. 49, Winter 1995, pp. 133–166.
- The archeology of Banality: The Soviet Home, Public Culture, Vol. 6, no. 2, 1994, pp. 263–292.
