= Elisabeth Beck-Gernsheim =

German sociologist and scholar (1946–2025)

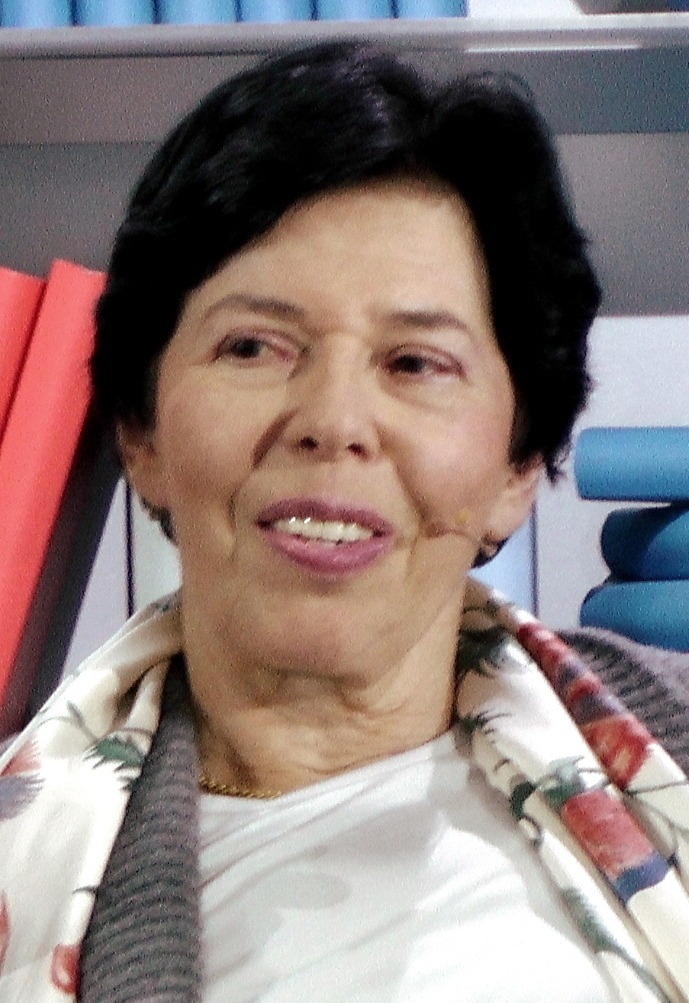
- Born: Elisabeth Gernsheim; 14 October 1946; Freiburg
- Died: October 22, 2025 (aged 79)
- Occupation: Sociologist
- Spouse: Ulrich Beck

Elisabeth Beck-Gernsheim (14 October 1946 – 22 October 2025) was a German sociologist. She held a professorship at the University of Erlangen-Nuremberg. She was one of the "first generation of female professors" in sociology and women's and gender studies.

== Early life and education ==
Elisabeth Gernsheim was born in Freiburg on 14 October 1946. Her family had Jewish heritage and relatives lived all over the world following the Holocaust. After studying sociology, psychology, and philosophy in Munich, she obtained her PhD in 1973, with a thesis The sociology of knowledge in the context of theoretical pluralism. Investigations into the mutual criticism of the sociology of knowledge, scientific theory and social psychology.

After several fellowships, she qualified as a professor from LMU Munich in 1987. Her professorial thesis was a social history of motherhood in the nineteenth and twentieth centuries, entitiled Geburtenrückgang und Kinderwunsch. Zur Sozialgeschichte der Mutterschaft im 19. und 20. Jahrhundert.

== Career ==
Beck-Gernsheim's main research interest was in social changes and the changing situation of the institution of the family. She worked on the sociology of work and occupation, the sociology of the family and gender relations, reproduction and technological development, as well as migration, ethnic and cultural differences, Her work dealt with sociological individualisation theory and questions of the transformation of modernity.

Beck-Gernsheim was awarded several postgraduate scholarships. These included a doctoral scholarship from LMU Munich, an intercultural exchange scholarship from the Studienkreis Foundation, a postdoctoral scholarship and a Heisenberg scholarship from the German Research Foundation (DFG). She was a visiting professor at the University of Giessen and LMU Munich.

She was professor of sociology at the University of Hamburg, then from 1994 held the role at the University of Erlangen–Nuremberg. She held fellowships at Cardiff University (1996), at the Wissenschaftskolleg zu Berlin (1997–1998), and at the Hamburg Institute for Social Research (2002–2003).

Following an official retirement in 2009, she was visiting professor at the Norwegian University of Science and Technology in Trondheim until 2012, a senior research fellow at LMU Munich (2013–2016), and a senior professor at Goethe University Frankfurt from 2016.

== Personal life ==
She married German sociologist Ulrich Beck in 1975, and they remained together until his death in 2015. On their regular hikes through the Bavarain Alps they often developed ideas and fine-tuned their theories together. Ulrich described himself as the “beneficiary of her thoughts ... with Elisabeth, I am forced to live the ‘cosmopolitan’ reality I am writing about”. Ulrich and Elisabeth co-authored two books together, The Normal Chaos of Love (1990) and Distant Love (2014).

Beck-Gernsheim died on 22 October 2025, at the age of 79.

== Works ==
- Das halbierte Leben (1980)
- Vom Geburtenrückgang zum ganz normalen Leben (1984)
- Welche Gesundheit wollen wir?: Dilemmata des medizintechnischen Fortschritts. Suhrkamp. 1995. ISBN 9783518119563.
- Die Kinderfrage. C. H. Beck. 2006 [First published 1988]. ISBN 9783406547768.
- Das ganz normale Chaos der Liebe (1990)
- Ulrich Beck; Elisabeth Beck-Gernsheim (1995). The normal chaos of love. Wiley-Blackwell. ISBN 978-0-7456-1382-6.
- Was kommt nach der Familie? (2000)
- Reinventing the family: in search of new lifestyles. Wiley-Blackwell. 2002. ISBN 978-0-7456-2214-9.
- Individualization: institutionalized individualism and its social and political consequences. SAGE. 2002. ISBN 978-0-7619-6112-3.
- The social implications of bioengineering. Humanities Press. 1995. ISBN 978-0-391-03841-7.
- "Ein Türke geht nicht in die Oper" – was Deutsche über Türken wissen, in: Robertson-von Trotha, Caroline Y. (ed.): Kultur und Gerechtigkeit (= Kulturwissenschaft interdisziplinär/Interdisciplinary Studies on Culture and Society, Vol. 2), Baden-Baden 2007, ISBN 978-3-8329-2604-5

== Recognition ==
In 2025, Beck-Gernsheim was awarded a prize for her life's scientific work by the German Sociological Association (Deutsche Gesellschaft für Soziologie) at the 42nd DGS Congress.
