= Late modernity =

Sociological concept

Late modernity (or liquid modernity) is the characterization of today's highly developed global societies as the continuation (or development) of modernity rather than as an element of the succeeding era known as postmodernity, or the postmodern. Introduced as "liquid" modernity by the Polish sociologist Zygmunt Bauman, late modernity is marked by the global capitalist economies with their increasing privatization of services and by the information revolution.

Among its characteristics is that some traits, which in previous generations were assigned to individuals by the community, are instead self-assigned individually and can be changed at will. As a result, people feel insecure about their identities and their places in society, and they feel anxious and distrustful about whether their self-proclaimed traits are being respected. Society as a whole feels more chaotic.

== Versus postmodernity ==
Social theorists and sociologists such as Scott Lash, Ulrich Beck, Zygmunt Bauman, and Anthony Giddens maintain (against postmodernists) that modernization continues into the contemporary era, which is thus better conceived as a radical state of late modernity. On technological and social changes since the 1960s, the concept of "late modernity" proposes that contemporary societies are a clear continuation of modern institutional transitions and cultural developments. Such authors talk about a reflexive modernization as post-traditional order which impact day-to-day social life and personal activities. Modernity now tends to be self-referring, instead of being defined largely in opposition to traditionalism, as with classical modernity.

Giddens does not dispute that important changes have occurred since "high" modernity, but he argues that we have not truly abandoned modernity. Rather, the modernity of contemporary society is a developed, radicalized, "late" modernity—but still modernity, not postmodernity. In such a perspective, postmodernism appears only as a hyper-technological version of modernity.

== Subjects ==
The subject is constructed in late modernity against the backdrop of a fragmented world of competing and contrasting identities and lifestyle cultures. The framing matrix of the late modern personality is the ambiguous way the fluid social relations of late modernity impinge on the individual, producing a reflexive and multiple self. The question of the self, argues Mandalios (1999), always intersects with the Other or non-self (e.g. stranger, outsider or opposite) who signifies the particular uniqueness or core aspect of the self; while the self performs this same process with its other as was originally worked out by the German philosopher Georg Hegel. Extending beyond modernity, the complexity of entwinement between identity and difference (same-other) extends all the way back to Plato according to Hegel, and the Greek polis argues Mandalios (see Civilization and the Human Subject , 1999).

== Characteristics ==
Bauman, who introduced the idea of liquid modernity, wrote that its characteristics are about the individual, namely increasing feelings of uncertainty and the privatization of ambivalence. The transition from solid modernity to liquid modernity, as theorized by Zygmunt Bauman, cannot be understood as a sudden epistemic rupture, but rather as a gradual and cumulative process of structural disintegration, whereby previously durable social forms undergo erosion. This transformation is rendered effectively irreversible by the intensification and acceleration of socio-historical dynamics, which preclude any meaningful reconstitution of former modes of stability. Consequently, the notion of liquid modernity emerges as a conceptual framework aimed at elucidating the underlying processes through which contemporary societies systematically generate, perpetuate, and normalize conditions of endemic instability as a defining feature of their organizational logic. It is a kind of chaotic continuation of modernity, where a person can shift from one social position to another in a fluid manner. Nomadism becomes a general trait of the "liquid modern" person as they flow through their own life like a tourist, changing places, jobs, spouses, values, and sometimes more—such as political or sexual orientation—excluding themselves from traditional networks of support, while also freeing themselves from the restrictions or requirements those networks impose.

Bauman stressed the new burden of responsibility that fluid modernism placed on the individual: traditional patterns would be replaced by self-chosen ones. Entry into the globalized society was open to anyone with their own stance and the ability to fund it, in a similar way as was the reception of travellers at the old-fashioned caravanserai. The result is a normative mindset with emphasis on shifting rather than on staying—on provisional or temporary in lieu of permanent (or "solid") commitment—which (the new style) can lead a person astray towards a prison of their own existential creation.

== See also ==
- Information society
- Neoliberalism
- Network society
- Post-industrial society
- Second modernity
- Late capitalism
- Space of flows
- Time–space compression
