= Simmering (Vienna) =

Coordinates: 48.174°N 16.416°E

Simmering Simmaring (Bavarian)
- 11th District of Vienna
- Coat of arms

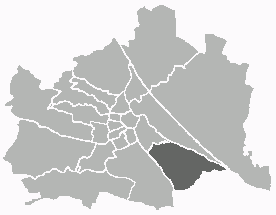
- Location of the district within Vienna
- Country: Austria
- City: Vienna

Government
  - District Director: Thomas Steinhart (SPÖ)
  - First Deputy: Ramona Miletic (SPÖ)
  - Second Deputy: Katharina Krammer (FPÖ)
  - Representation (60 Members): SPÖ 27, FPÖ 23, Greens 4, ÖVP 3, NEOS 2, KPÖ 1

Area
  - Total: 23.23 km^{2} (8.97 sq mi)

Population (2022-01-01)
  - Total: 106,078
  - Density: 4,566/km^{2} (11,830/sq mi)
- Postal code: A-1110
- Address of District Office: Enkplatz 2 A-1110 Wien
- Website: www.wien.gv.at/bezirke/simmering/

Simmering (German pronunciation: [ˈzɪməʁɪŋ]; Viennese: Simmaring) is the 11th district of Vienna, Austria (German: 11. Bezirk, Simmering). It borders the Danube and was established as a district in 1892. Simmering has several churches, some museums, schools, old castles, and four cemeteries, one of them being the Wiener Zentralfriedhof, one of the largest cemeteries of Europe.

== History ==
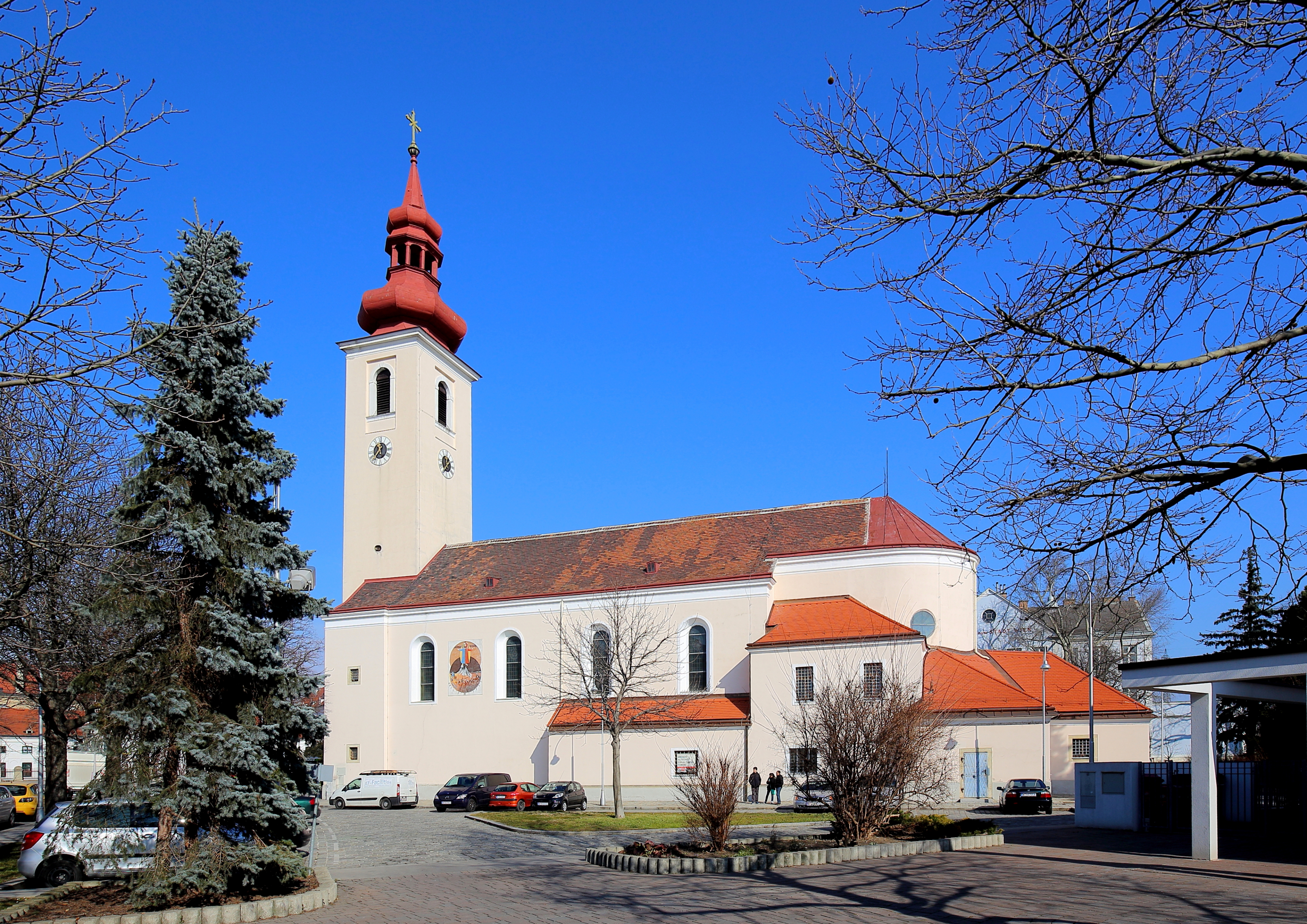
Saints Peter and Paul Church in Kaiserebersdorf

The first indications of the settlement Simmering are from 1028. A brewery was built in 1605 and continued to bring in revenue for the area for more than 300 years. Simmering remained small until 1860, when the Rinnböckhäuser housing development was built, which at the time was the second-largest in Vienna, and resulted in rapid growth in the area.

Kaiserebersdorf (earlier known as Ebersdorf) was one of the original villages in the district and held the residence of the Ebendorfer dynasty. Holy Roman Emperor Maximilian II hunted frequently in the area and converted the residence into the hunting lodge Schloss Neugebäude.

On January 1, 1892, Simmering, Kaiserebersdorf, and some very small parts of Kledering, Schwechat, and Albern were incorporated into Vienna as the 11th district.

The first indications of the small town of Albern originate from 1162. The town was small throughout its history. It had to be moved and resettled twice due to flooding from the Danube. On October 15, 1938, the town was moved to the former 23rd district of Schwechat. But after World War II, it was moved to the 2nd district Leopoldstadt so that its refineries would belong to the Soviet-occupied quarter of Vienna. In 1955, in the Austrian State Treaty it became part of Simmering.

== Coat of arms ==
The coat of arms for the 11th district has three parts, each representing one of the former villages that were united to form the district. The silver "S" on a blue background stands for the former village of Simmering. The rearing unicorn on a golden background stands for Kaiserebersdorf and comes from the coat of arms of the Herr von Hintperg-Ebersdorf, who founded the settlement. The third part shows the symbol of the former village of Albern. The crossed fish on red background are reminiscent of the fishing tradition that was important to the people of Albern.

== Geography ==
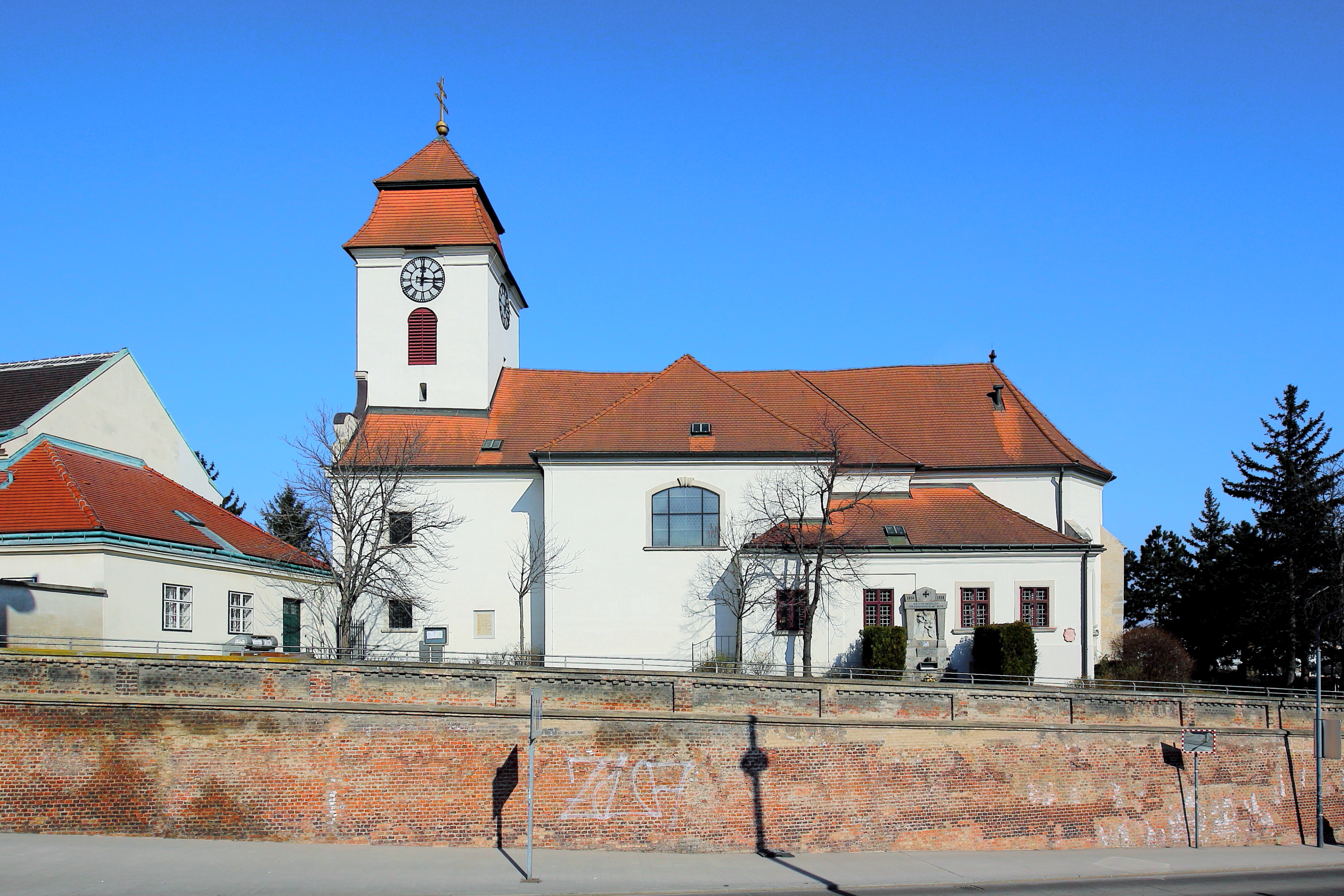
St. Laurenz Kirche in the Simmeringer Friedhof

The district lies in the southern part of Vienna. It borders the Danube and Danube Canal to the east and the East railway to the west. Of all the districts, Simmering is the lowest district in terms of elevation.

== Transportation ==
Simmering has always been on important transport routes to the south and east. These include the following:

- Simmering was crossed by the Wiener Neustadt Canal, which has fallen into disuse around Simmering.
- Many railway lines pass through Simmering, such as the East railway, the railway to Aspang, and many industrial lines.
- Albern is home to a harbour for cereals on the River Danube.
- The high street in Simmering dates back to a Roman road.
- The motorway A4 to Vienna International Airport and on to Hungary starts in Simmering.

== Politics ==
Simmering was a stronghold for social democrats as early as the start of the 20th century. In the district vote of 1919, the social democrats won 21 positions in the district government, with the Christian Social Party taking the next largest vote with only 7 seats and the Tschechische Liste (literally Czech list) taking 2 seats. The social democrats of Simmering and of the rest of the so-called "Rotes Wien" (Red Vienna) pushed to build housing developments throughout Vienna and in 1934, 19 Gemeindebauten were built in Simmering.

The rise of Nazism in Vienna was hardly acknowledged in the vote of Simmering, as the party took only 7.2% of the vote in 1932, the worst outcome in the whole city. Even after 1945, the Social Democratic Party (SPÖ) continued to dominate the votes. In the mid-1990s, the SPÖ fell from 59% to 48% of the vote and lost their majority, with the Freedom Party (FPÖ) gaining support to 31% of the vote. The trend reversed itself in 2001, and the SPÖ retook 59.22% of the vote, FPÖ took 21.37%, Austrian People's Party (ÖVP) had 9.82%, the Greens had 6.77%, and the Liberal Forum barely took a seat with 2.02% of the vote. In 2005, the SPÖ improved their result slightly to 60.7%, before losing the absolute majority with a loss of 11% at the following election in 2010, finishing with 49.2% of the vote. The ÖVP and Greens also lost voters, while the FPÖ nearly doubled their share of the vote to 34.2%. In 2015, the SPÖ lost the relative majority to the FPÖ. Simmering is the first Viennese district with an FPÖ district director.

District Directors since 1945
Eduard Pantucek (SPÖ)	4/1945-7/1945
Max Wopenka (SPÖ)	1945–1952
Josef Haas (SPÖ)	1952–1964
Wilhelm Weber (SPÖ)	1964–1973
Johann Paulas (SPÖ)	1973–1980
Otto Mraz (SPÖ)	1980–1989
Franz Haas (SPÖ)	1989–2001
Otmar Brix (SPÖ)	2001–2003
Renate Angerer (SPÖ)	2003-2014
Eva-Maria Hatzl (SPÖ)	2014-2015
Paul Johann Stadler (FPÖ)	2015-2020
Thomas Steinhart (SPÖ)	2020–present

== Infrastructure ==
The 11th district has always been known for its industries. In the 19th century, Simmering generated and supplied the electricity for the Straßenbahnen (trams) of Vienna and also had a gas works to supply the city with town gas for its lights. The gas works produced natural gas from 1899 to 1978, but today serves as a distribution post for natural gas brought in. There were huge 70-meter tall gas tanks on the premises, called the Gasometer (featured in the James Bond film The Living Daylights). Reconstruction in 2001 converted the structures from containers to buildings that today house apartments, offices, a shopping centre, and a cinema. The towers of the Gasometer have ranked next to the Zentralfriedhof as a landmark of the 11th district.

The district also hosts other municipal infrastructure, including the EBS (special material recycling center), a sewage treatment facility that treats about 90% of the city's sewage, and also a juvenile detention center.

== Gardens ==
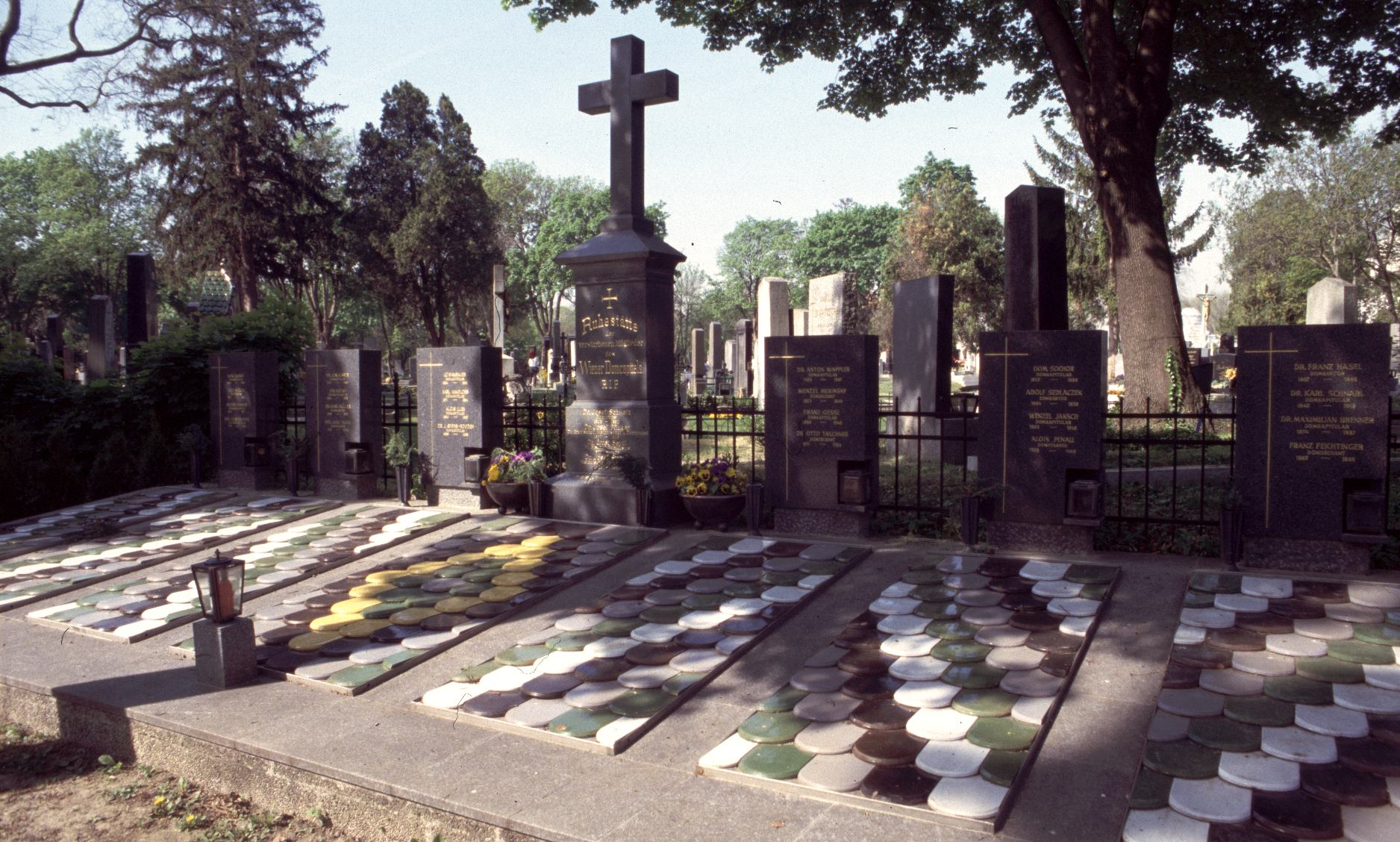
A scene at the Zentralfriedhof

Simmering is home to many large undeveloped stretches of greenery and fields full of vegetable gardens that provide produce for the city.

== Industry ==
Many industries call Simmering home, including Simmering-Graz-Pauker (SGP, rail car manufacturer), Steyr (armory, weapons, and military vehicle manufacturer), Hoerbiger (compression valve manufacturer, founded by Hanns Hörbiger), and other companies in the electrical and pharmaceutical industries.

== Cultural and medial reflection ==
1979 Simmering, a poetic documentary film about Simmering was released by Alexander Schukoff and Reinhard Kofler. Prior to her death, Russian-American cultural theorist Svetlana Boym worked on the short film Remembering Forgetting based on her time at the transit refugee camp for Jewish emigrants from the Soviet Union in 1981, for which she interviewed Schukoff and other Jewish intellectuals who stayed at the camp. Among them were Masha Gessen, Vitaly Komar, Anton Vidokle, and Regina Spektor. The film debuted in 2016.

== Notable people ==
- Rosa Jochmann, social democrat and resistance fighter
- Christian Kern, social democratic Chancellor of Austria (2016–2017)
- Karl Sesta (Szestak), footballer
- Ernst Stojaspal, footballer
- Gunther (Walter), professional wrestler

== Sightseeing ==
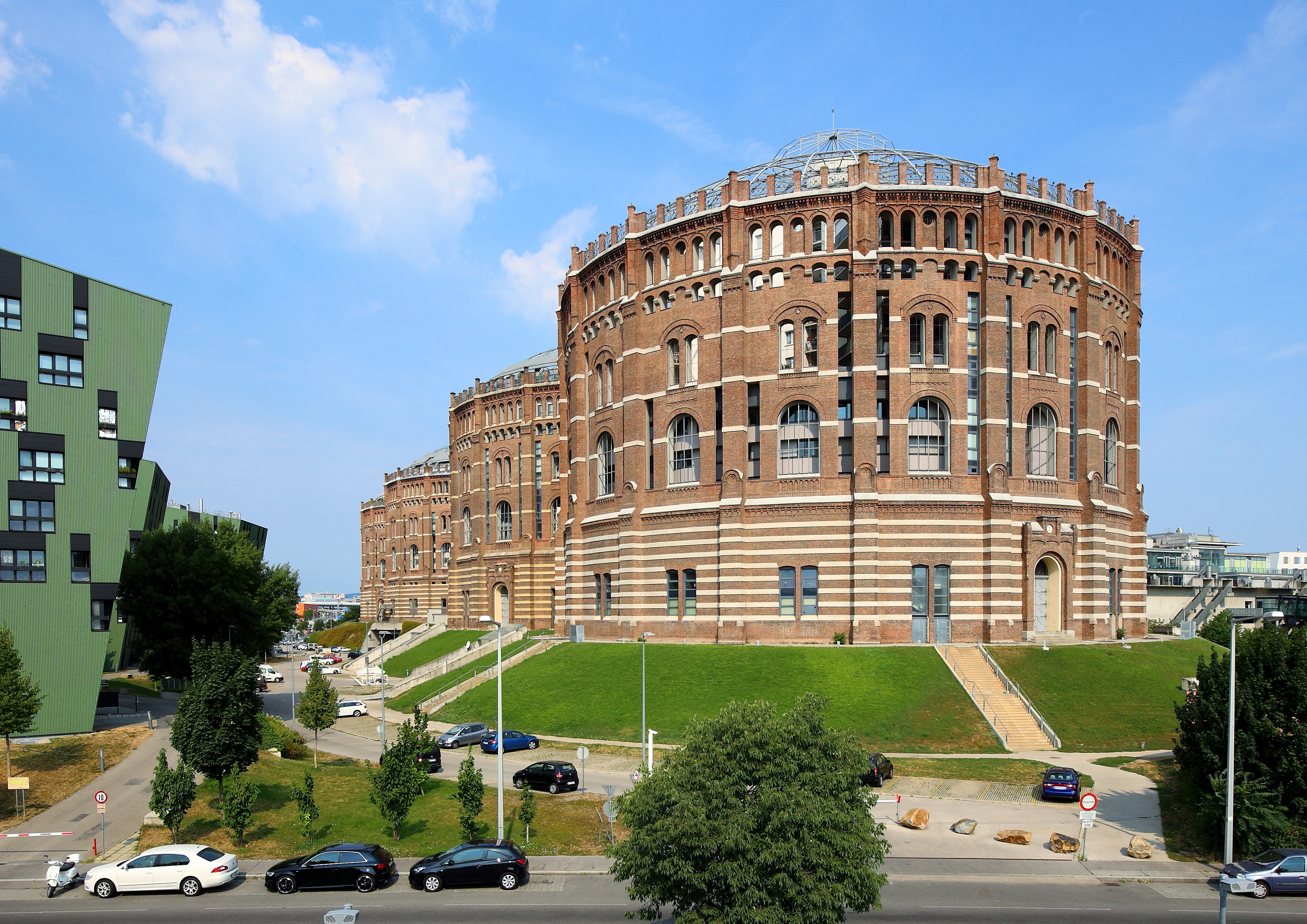
Gasometer in Simmering

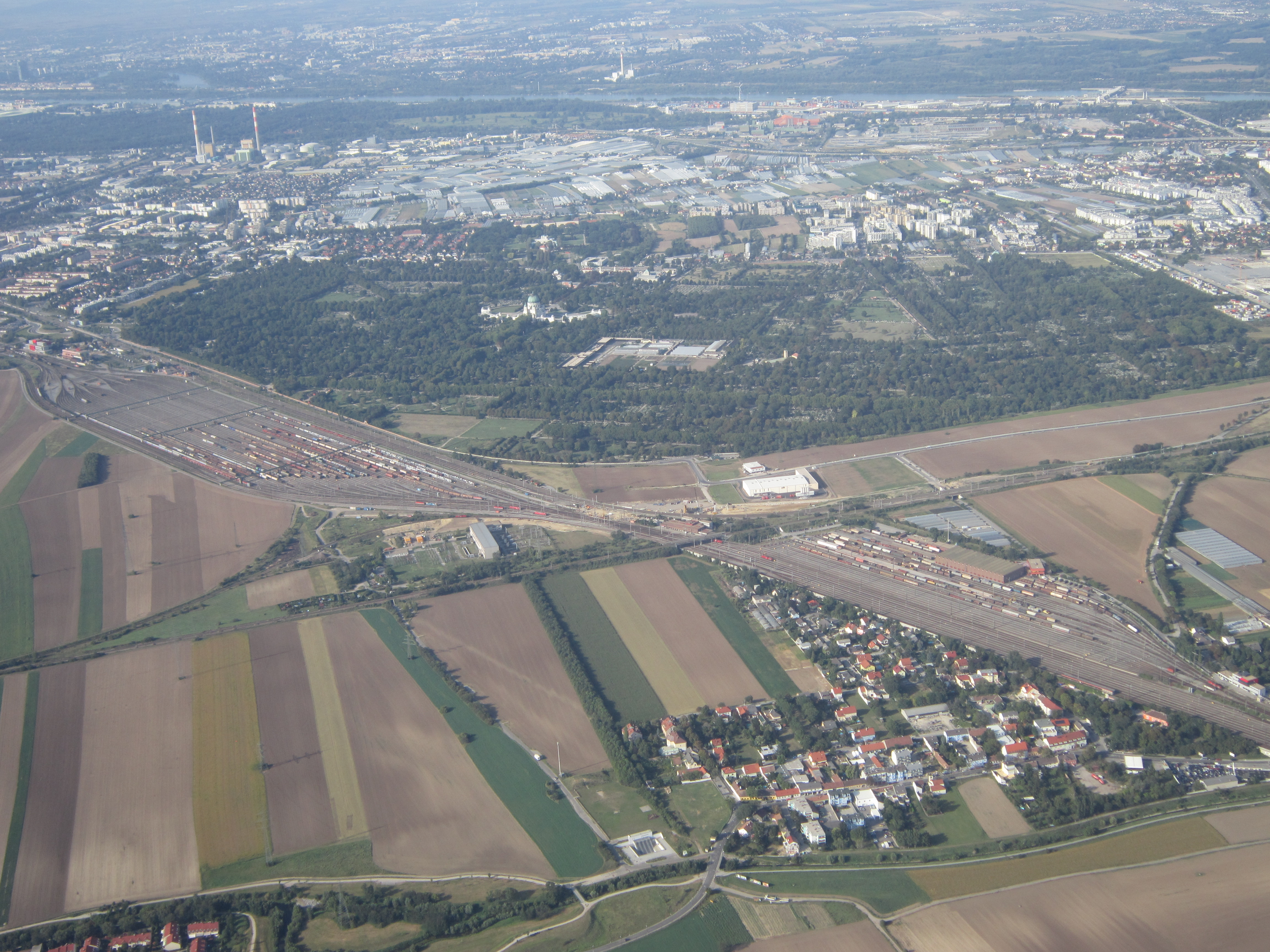
Aerial photo showing the central marshalling yard, the central cemetery, the Simmering power station, and the river Danube in the background

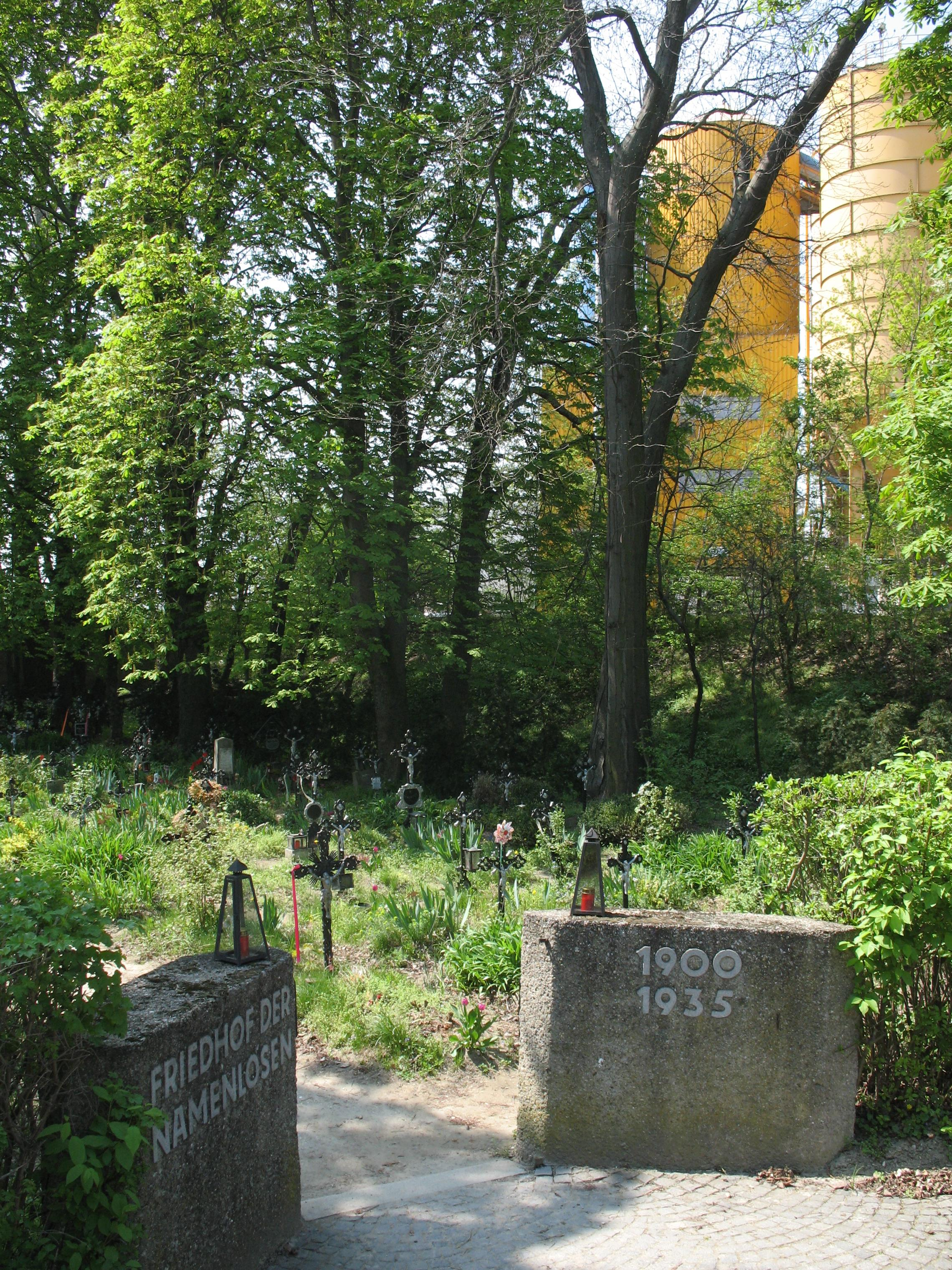
Cemetery of the Nameless

The following are points of interest:

- Feuerhalle Simmering - crematorium
- Friedhof der Namenlosen, cemetery of the nameless
- Gasometer, gas tanks remodelled into housing, offices, and shopping venues
- Lueger Kirche - church
- Schloss Concordia - castle
- Schloss Neugebäude - castle
- Schloss Thürnlhof - castle
- Wiener Zentralfriedhof, cemetery
