= Ulrich Beck =

German sociologist (1944–2015)

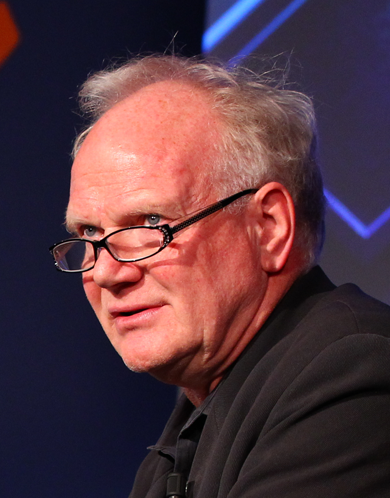
- Beck in 2012
- Born: 15 May 1944; Stolp, Germany (now Słupsk, Poland)
- Died: 1 January 2015 (aged 70); Munich, Germany
- Occupation: Sociologist

Ulrich Beck (German: [bɛk]; 15 May 1944 – 1 January 2015) was a German sociologist, and one of the most cited social scientists in the world during his lifetime. His work focused on questions of uncontrollability, ignorance and uncertainty in the modern age, and he coined the terms "risk society" and "second modernity" or "reflexive modernization". He also tried to overturn national perspectives that predominated in sociological investigations with a cosmopolitanism that acknowledges the interconnectedness of the modern world. He was a professor at LMU Munich and also held appointments at the Fondation Maison des Sciences de l’Homme (FMSH) in Paris, and at the London School of Economics.

== Life ==
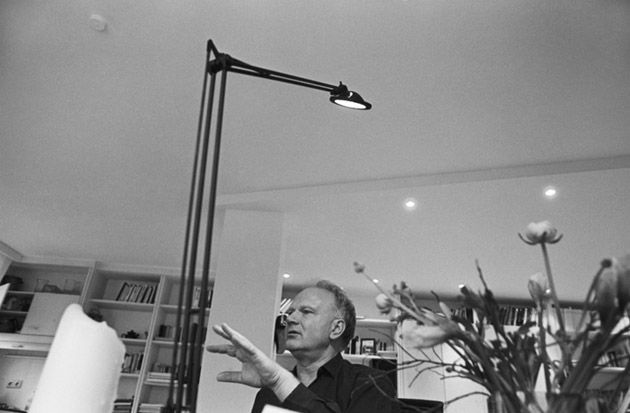
Ulrich Beck in his flat in Munich, 1999

Beck was born in the Pomeranian town of Stolp, Germany (now Słupsk in Poland), in 1944, and grew up in Hanover. He began university studies with a focus on law at the University of Freiburg, and from 1966 onwards studied sociology, philosophy, psychology and political science at LMU Munich. Starting in 1972, after earning a doctorate, he was employed at LMU Munich as a sociologist. In 1979, he qualified as a university lecturer with a habilitation thesis. He received appointments as professor at the University of Münster (1979–1981) and the University of Bamberg (1981–1992). From 1992 until his death, Beck was professor of sociology and director of the Institute for Sociology at LMU Munich. He received numerous international awards and honors, including election to the Council and Executive Board of the German Society for Sociology.

From 1995 to 1997, he was a member of the Kommission für Zukunftsfragen der Freistaaten Bayern und Sachsen (Bavarian and Saxon State Commission for Questions Concerning the Future). Beginning in 1999, he was the speaker of the DFG research programme on reflexive modernity.

From 1999 to 2009, Beck was a spokesman of the Collaborative Reflexive Modernization Research Centre 536, an interdisciplinary consortium of four universities in the Munich area funded and overseen by the German Research Foundation (DFG). Beck's theory of interdisciplinary reflexive modernization on a basis of a wide range of topics in appropriate research was empirically tested. The theory of reflexive modernization works from the basic idea that the rise of the modern industrial age produces side-effects across the globe that provide the institutional basis and coordinates that modern nation-states question, modify, and open for political action.

He was active as sociologist and public intellectual in Germany and throughout the world, regularly intervening in debates on the European Union, climate change and nuclear energy. At the time of his death, he and his international research group were only 1.5 years into the 5-year research project "Methodological Cosmopolitanism – in the Laboratory of Climate Change" (the Cosmo-Climate Research Project), of which Beck was the Principal investigator. For this research project he received the prestigious ERC Advanced Grant, scheduled to terminate in 2018. Along with Beck, sociologists David Tyfield and Anders Blok lead work packages within the overall project. The project also fostered international research collaboration with various research 'hubs' in East Asia through the Europe-Asia Research Network (EARN). In cooperation with EARN, Beck and sociologist Sang-Jin Han had been set to lead a 2-year project for the Seoul Metropolitan Government beginning in 2015.

Beck was a member of the Board of Trustees at the Jewish Center in Munich and a member of the German branch of PEN International.

He was married to the German social scientist Elisabeth Beck-Gernsheim (1946–2025). He died of a myocardial infarction on 1 January 2015, at the age of 70.

== Research contributions ==
For 25 years, Beck delivered new diagnoses to the following question: How can social and political thought and action in the face of radical global change (environmental destruction, financial crisis, global warming, the crisis of democracy and the nation-state institutions) be intertwined in a new modernity? A radicalized modernity, for Beck, attacks its own foundations. Institutions such as the nation-state and the family are globalized 'from the inside'.

Beck studied modernization, ecological problems, individualization and globalization. Later in his career, he embarked on exploring the changing conditions of work in a world of increasing global capitalism, declining influence of unions and flexibilisation of the labour process, a then new theory rooted in the concept of cosmopolitanism. Beck also contributed a number of new words to German and anglophone sociology, including "risk society", "second modernity", reflexive modernization and Brazilianization (Brasilianisierung). According to Beck, all contemporary political thinking emanates from the methodological nationalism of political thought and sociology (and other social sciences).

Risk society was coined by Ulrich Beck and Anthony Giddens during the 1980s. According to Beck and Giddens, the traditional industrial class structure of modern society is breaking apart. Globalization creates risks that concern people from all different classes; for example, radioactivity, pollution, and even unemployment. Affluent households act to insulate themselves from these risks, but cannot do so for some; for example global environmental change. The poor suffer them. He points out that risks are also socially constructed and some risks are perceived as more dangerous because they are discussed in mass media more frequently, such as terrorism. Risk society leads to analysis of risks, causing prejudgment.

Beck was the editor of the sociological journal, Soziale Welt (in German, since 1980), author of some 150 articles, and author or editor of many books.

== The Spinelli Group ==
On 15 September 2010, Beck supported the European Parliament's Spinelli Group initiative to reinvigorate federalism in the European Union. The Union of European Federalists and its youth organisation Young European Federalists promoted the idea of European federalism for over 60 years, with a "belief that only a European Federation, based on the idea of unity in diversity, could overcome the division of the European continent". Prominent supporters of the initiative have included Jacques Delors, Daniel Cohn-Bendit, Guy Verhofstadt, Andrew Duff and Elmar Brok.

== Awards ==
- 1996 Cultural Honor Prize of the City of Munich
- 1999 CICERO speaker price award
- 1999 German-British Forum Award for outstanding service to German-British relations (together with Anthony Giddens)
- 2004 Award of DGS for outstanding achievements in the field of public achievement in sociology
- 2005 Schader Prize, the most prestigious award for social scientists in Germany
- 2014 Lifetime Achievement Award for Distinguished Contribution to Future Research of the International Sociological Association
- In 2013 he received an ERC advanced grant to carry out the Cosmo-Climate Research Project (Methodological Cosmopolitanism: In the Laboratory of Climate Change), with David Tyfield and Anders Blok amongst others.
- Honorary doctorates (8): University of Jyväskylä, Finland (1996), University of Macerata, Italy (2006), University of Madrid (UNED), Spain (2007), Catholic University of Eichstätt-Ingolstadt (2010), University of Lausanne, Switzerland (2011), Free University of Varna, Bulgaria (2011), University of Buenos Aires, Argentina (2013), St. Kliment Ohridski University of Sofia, Bulgaria (2013).

== Works ==
Among his major works are:

- Beck, Ulrich (1974) Objectivity and normativity: The theory-practice debate in modern German and American sociology. Reinbek: Rowohlt.
- Beck, Ulrich & Brater, Michael & Jürgen, Hans (1980). Home: Sociology of work and occupations. Basics, problem areas, research results, Reinbek: Rowohlt.
- Beck, Ulrich (1986) Risikogesellschaft – Auf dem Weg in eine andere Moderne (Risk Society)
- Beck, Ulrich (1988) Gegengifte: die organisierte Unverantwortlichkeit. Frankfurt am Main: Suhrkamp.
- Beck, Ulrich (1992) Risk Society: Towards a New Modernity. London: Sage.
- Beck, Ulrich & Beck-Gernsheim, Elisabeth (1994) Riskante Freiheiten – Gesellschaftliche Individualisierungsprozesse in der Moderne
- Beck, Ulrich & Giddens, Anthony & Lash, Scott (1994) Reflexive Modernization: Politics, Tradition and Aesthetics in the Modern Social Order. Cambridge: Polity Press.
- Beck, Ulrich & Vossenkuhl, Wilhelm & Ziegler, Ulf, photographs by T. Rautert (1995) Eigenes Leben – Ausflüge in die unbekannte Gesellschaft, in der wir leben C.H. Beck.
- Beck-Gernsheim, Elisabeth & Beck, Ulrich (1995) The Normal Chaos of Love. Cambridge: Polity Press.
- Beck, Ulrich (1995) Ecological Politics in an Age of Risk. Cambridge: Polity Press.
- Beck, Ulrich (1996) The Reinvention of Politics: Rethinking Modernity in the Global Social Order. Cambridge: Polity Press.
- Beck, Ulrich (1997) Was ist Globalisierung?
- Beck, Ulrich (1998) Democracy without Enemies. Cambridge: Polity Press.
- Beck, Ulrich (1998) World Risk Society. Cambridge: Polity Press.
- Beck, Ulrich (1999) What Is Globalization? Cambridge: Polity Press.
- Beck, Ulrich (2000) The Brave New World of Work. Cambridge: Cambridge University Press.
- Adam, Barbara & Beck, Ulrich & Van Loon, Joost (2000) The Risk Society and Beyond: Critical Issues for Social Theory. London: Sage.
- Beck, Ulrich & Beck-Gernsheim, Elisabeth (2002) Individualization: Institutionalized Individualism and its Social and Political Consequences. London: Sage.
- Beck, Ulrich & Willms, Johannes (2003) Conversations with Ulrich Beck. Cambridge: Polity Press.
- Beck, Ulrich (2005) Power in the Global Age. Cambridge: Polity Press.
- Beck, Ulrich (2006) Cosmopolitan Vision. Cambridge: Polity Press.
- Beck, Ulrich & Grande, Edgar (2007) Cosmopolitan Europe. Cambridge: Polity Press.
- Beck, Ulrich (2009) World at Risk. Cambridge: Polity Press.
- Poferl, Angelika & Beck, Ulrich (eds.) (2010) Große Armut, großer Reichtum. Zur Transnationalisierung sozialer Ungleichheit. Frankfurt am Main: Suhrkamp Verlag.
- Beck, Ulrich & Grande, Edgar (2010) "Varieties of second modernity: extra-European and European experiences and perspectives" British Journal of Sociology, Vol 61, Issue 3, pages 406–638.
- Beck, Ulrich (2012) Das deutsche Europa: Neue Machtlandschaften im Zeichen der Krise, Berlin: Suhrkamp Verlag.
- Beck, Ulrich (2013) German Europe. Cambridge: Polity Press.
- Beck, Ulrich and Cronin, Ciaran (2014) Cosmopolitan Vision. Cambridge: Polity Press.

=== Essays ===
- ”World citizens of all countries, unite! Democracy beyond the nation-state: Europe must make a beginning. Theses for a cosmopolitan manifesto”. (World Citizen manifest) in. The Time, 1998 No. 30
- ”The Society of the Less. The burst dream of the rise in Germany”, ZDF, 17 January 2005
- ”Gentle world power Europe. Vision of a cosmopolitan empire that no longer relies on national ideas”, in: Frankfurter Rundschau 5 July 2005
- ”Blind to reality”, in: Frankfurter Rundschau, 3 September 2005
- ”Europe can not be built on the ruins of the nations”, with Anthony Giddens, In: The World, 1 October 2005
- ”Farewell to the utopia of full employment”, in: Neue Zürcher Zeitung, 4 November 2006
- ”Tragic individualization”, in: Sheets for German and international politics, 2007, Issue 5, pp 577–584.
- ”God is dangerous” in Die Zeit, 2007 No. 52.
- ”The error of the caterpillar”, in: Frankfurt general newspaper 14 June 2011
- ”Fainting, but legitimate”, in: the daily newspaper (taz) 28 October 2011
- ”Machiavellis power”, in: Der Spiegel, 8 October 2012
- ”For a European Spring!”, in: the daily newspaper (taz), 23 November 2012

=== Interviews ===
- “Freedom or capitalism”. Ulrich Beck in an interview with Johannes Willms, Suhrkamp, Frankfurt am Main 2000
- ”Interview, Telepolis”, 28 November 1997
- "Choice will not save the country," interview in New Window
- ”An encounter” (Memento of 6 July 2007 at the Internet Archive) with Beck on Lake Starnberg, Der Tagesspiegel 23 September 2005
- "Unemployment is a victory": Interview with Constantine Sakkas, in: Der Tagesspiegel on 30 November 2006.
- "Anyone can create their own God," in the Tagesspiegel of 20 July 2008
- ”Questions of faith. A new enthusiasm”, talk with Arno Widmann, in: Frankfurter Rundschau, 15. August 2008
- ”Action in the state of not knowing”. Ulrich Beck, Risk Society theorists, on the turncoats of the financial crisis and the importance of Europe. in: Frankfurter Rundschau, 5 November 2008
- ”Merkel engages in the dressing up box in”: Süddeutsche Zeitung, 12. February 2010
- ”A strategically staged mistake”, talk with Andreas Zielcke in: Süddeutsche Zeitung, 14. March 2011
- ”In bed with the others”, Ulrich Beck and Elisabeth Beck-Gernsheim in conversation with Ulrich Gutmair, in: taz: Die Tageszeitung 12 October 2011 at
- ”The common identity should first be identified”, Ulrich Beck and Elisabeth Beck-Gernsheim in conversation with Jeanette Villa Chica, in: Tages-Anzeiger, 9 November 2011
- ”Love across national borders”, Ulrich Beck and Elisabeth Beck-Gernsheim, in: Time Campus 22 November 2011
- ”About the Merkiavellismus”, talk with Nils Minkmar, in: Frankfurter Allgemeine Zeitung, 16 January 2013
- ”More Willy Brandt dare Ulrich Beck and Martin Schulz on the future of Europe”, in: Frankfurter Allgemeine Zeitung, 24 May 2013

== See also ==
- Global governance
