= The Modern Project =

Political and philosophical movement that gave rise to modernity

The Modern Project is a general name for the political and philosophical movement that gives rise to modernity, broadly understood. The modern project begins in the late Middle Ages or the Renaissance. Retrospectively philosophers, scientists, and other historical figures in Western culture can be seen during that period as displaying a greater proclivity to question the givenness of the world — a givenness espoused in classical philosophy and Judeo-Christian revelation — and to assert the centrality of the human mind as the basis for human power. The various ideated abstractions and views associated with the Modern Project include: materialism, determinism (metaphysics), rationalism, empiricism, skepticism (epistemology), utilitarianism, Kantian ethics, social contract (ethics), atheism, agnosticism, secularism, humanism (religion), individualism, egalitarianism, cosmopolitanism (sociology), capitalism, socialism, communism (economics), progressivism, liberalism, democracy, constitutionalism, and nationalism (politics).

Niccolò Machiavelli, Francis Bacon, René Descartes, and Galileo Galilei can all be said to be important initiators of the modern project, however the conceptual shift that prepared the way for the modern project likely began even earlier with the writings of Duns Scotus and William of Ockham. The success of Newtonian mechanics marked a major victory of the modern project and is sometimes credited with beginning the Enlightenment.

The use of the word "project" in this case is related to Heidegger's use of Entwurf, often translated as project or projection, in Being and Time. "An Entwurf in Heidegger's sense is not a particular plan or project; it is what makes any plan or project possible." The use of Entwurf is in direct response to German philosophers who saw the "modern" as a moment unfolding in history rather than as a condition of being. Heidegger's use of Entwurf thus moves the ground of the discussion from historicism to ontology.

Leo Strauss says of the modern project that it no longer allows philosophy or science "to be understood as essentially contemplative," but instead requires that those two disciplines actively seek to relieve man's estate. The purpose thereof is to promote ever greater prosperity, freedom, and justice.
