= Dual-beta =

In investing, dual-beta is the idea that the single regular market beta can be usefully replaced with two finer-grained measures, a downside beta and an upside beta.

== Dual-beta vs Beta Models of Average Returns ==
The Capital Asset Pricing Model posits that individual stock returns move with the overall stock market symmetrically, i.e., that their upside and downside betas are identical. The dual-beta model attempts to differentiate downside risk (risk of loss) from upside risk (gain), both measured in terms of beta with respect to the market and not individual idiosyncratic risk.

Mathematically, neither the two betas nor their average needs to be similar to the overall single beta. However, under normal circumstances, the two betas often average to the single beta.

In practice, it is difficult to estimate the future downside market-beta. Indeed, the historical single beta is a better predictor of the future downside beta than the historical downside beta.

== See also ==
- Cost of capital
- Financial risk
- Macro risk
