= Upside beta =

In investing, upside beta is the element of traditional beta that investors do not typically associate with the true meaning of risk. It is defined to be the scaled amount by which an asset tends to move compared to a benchmark, calculated only on days when the benchmark's return is positive.

== Formula ==
Upside beta measures this upside risk. Defining $r_i$ and $r_m$ as the excess returns to security $i$ and market $m$, $u_m$ as the average market excess return, and Cov and Var as the covariance and variance operators, the CAPM can be modified to incorporate upside (or downside) beta as follows.

$$\beta^+=\frac{\operatorname{Cov}(r_i,r_m \mid r_m>u_m)}{\operatorname{Var}(r_m \mid r_m>u_m)},$$

with downside beta $\beta^-$ defined with the inequality directions reversed. Therefore, $\beta^-$ and $\beta^+$ can be estimated with a regression of excess return of security $i$ on excess return of the market, conditional on excess market return being below the mean (downside beta) and above the mean (upside beta)." Upside beta is calculated using asset returns only on those days when the benchmark returns are positive. Upside beta and downside beta are also differentiated in the dual-beta model.

== See also ==
- Cost of capital
- Downside risk
- Macro risk
