= Social risk positions =

Sociology concept

Social risk positions are social positions that are dictated by the ability to avert risk. They are largely dependent on an individual’s ability to access knowledge. Because manufactured risk is often imperceptible to the bare human senses, social risk position must be gained by creating networks of knowledge with other humans who have a greater access to risk information. Social risk positions influence status in risk society.

== See also ==
- Social risk
