= Upside risk =

In investing, upside risk is the uncertain possibility of gain. It is measured by upside beta. An alternative measure of upside risk is the upper semi-deviation. Upside risk is calculated using data only from days when the benchmark (for example S&P 500 Index) has gone up. Upside risk focuses on uncertain positive returns rather than negative returns. For this reason, upside risk, while a measure of unpredictability of the extent of gains, is not a “risk” in the sense of a possibility of adverse outcomes.

== Upside risk vs. Capital Asset Pricing Model ==
Looking at upside risk and downside risk separately provides much more useful information to investors than does only looking at the single Capital Asset Pricing Model (CAPM) beta. The comparison of upside to downside risk is necessary because “modern portfolio theory measures risk in terms of standard deviation of asset returns, which treats both positive and negative deviations from expected returns as risk.” In other words, regular beta measures both upside and downside risk. This is a major distinction that the CAPM fails to take into account, because the model assumes that upside beta and downside beta are the same. In reality, they are seldom the same, and making the distinction between upside and downside risk is necessary and important.

== See also ==
- Cost of capital
- Dual-beta
- Macro risk
