= Risk society =

Manner in which modern society organizes in response to risk

Risk society is the manner in which modern society organizes in response to risk. The term is closely associated with several key writers on modernity, in particular Ulrich Beck and Anthony Giddens. The term was coined in the 1980s and its popularity during the 1990s was both as a consequence of its links to trends in thinking about wider modernity, and also to its links to popular discourse, in particular the growing environmental concerns during the period.

== Definition ==
According to the British sociologist Anthony Giddens, a risk society is "a society increasingly preoccupied with the future (and also with safety), which generates the notion of risk", whilst the German sociologist Ulrich Beck defines it as "a systematic way of dealing with hazards and insecurities induced and introduced by modernisation itself".

Beck defined modernization as,

surges of technological rationalization and changes in work and organization, but beyond that includes much more: the change in societal characteristics and normal biographies, changes in lifestyle and forms of love, change in the structures of power and influence, in the forms of political repression and participation, in views of reality and in the norms of knowledge. In social science's understanding of modernity, the plough, the steam locomotive and the microchip are visible indicators of a much deeper process, which comprises and reshapes the entire social structure.

== Background ==
=== Modernity and realism in science ===
Beck and Giddens both approach the risk society firmly from the perspective of modernity, "a shorthand term for modern society or industrial civilization. ... [M]odernity is vastly more dynamic than any previous type of social order. It is a society ... which unlike any preceding culture lives in the future rather than the past." They also draw heavily on the concept of reflexivity, the idea that as a society examines itself, it in turn changes itself in the process. In classical industrial society, the modernist view is based on assumption of realism in science creating a system in which scientists work in an exclusive, inaccessible environment of modern period.

== Implications ==
=== Environmental risks ===
In 1986, right after the Chernobyl disaster, Ulrich Beck, a sociology professor at LMU Munich, published the original German text, Risikogesellschaft, of his highly influential and catalytic work (Suhrkamp, Frankfurt 1986). Risikogesellschaft was published in English as Risk Society: Towards a New Modernity in 1992. The ecological crisis is central to this social analysis of the contemporary period. Beck argued that environmental risks had become the predominant product, not just an unpleasant, manageable side-effect, of industrial society.

Giddens and Beck argued that whilst humans have always been subjected to a level of risk – such as natural disasters – these have usually been perceived as produced by non-human forces. Modern societies, however, are exposed to risks such as pollution, newly discovered illnesses, crime, that are the result of the modernization process itself. Giddens defines these two types of risks as external risks and manufactured risks. Manufactured risks are marked by a high level of human agency involved in both producing, and mitigating such risks.

As manufactured risks are the product of human activity, authors like Giddens and Beck argue that it is possible for societies to assess the level of risk that is being produced, or that is about to be produced. This sort of reflexive introspection can in turn alter the planned activities themselves. As an example, due to disasters such as Chernobyl and the Love Canal Crisis, public faith in the modern project has declined leaving public distrust in industry, government and experts.

Social concerns led to increased regulation of the nuclear power industry and to the abandonment of some expansion plans, altering the course of modernization itself. This increased critique of modern industrial practices is said to have resulted in a state of reflexive modernization, illustrated by concepts such as sustainability and the precautionary principle that focus on preventive measures to decrease levels of risk.

There are differing opinions as to how the concept of a risk society interacts with social hierarchies and class distinctions. Most agree that social relations have altered with the introduction of manufactured risks and reflexive modernization. Risks, much like wealth, are distributed unevenly in a population and will influence quality of life.

Beck has argued that older forms of class structure – based mainly on the accumulation of wealth – atrophy in a modern, risk society, in which people occupy social risk positions that are achieved through risk aversion. "In some of their dimensions these follow the inequalities of class and strata positions, but they bring a fundamentally different distribution logic into play". Beck contends that widespread risks contain a "boomerang effect", in that individuals producing risks will also be exposed to them. This argument suggests that wealthy individuals whose capital is largely responsible for creating pollution will also have to suffer when, for example, the contaminants seep into the water supply. This argument may seem oversimplified, as wealthy people may have the ability to mitigate risk more easily by, for example, buying bottled water. Beck, however, has argued that the distribution of this sort of risk is the result of knowledge, rather than wealth. Whilst the wealthy person may have access to resources that enable him or her to avert risk, this would not even be an option were the person unaware that the risk even existed. However, risks do not only affect those of a certain social class or place, as risk is not missed and can affect everyone regardless of societal class; no one is free from risk.

By contrast, Giddens has argued that older forms of class structure maintain a somewhat stronger role in a risk society, now being partly defined "in terms of differential access to forms of self-actualization and empowerment". Giddens has also tended to approach the concept of a risk society more positively than Beck, suggesting that there "can be no question of merely taking a negative attitude towards risk. Risk needs to be disciplined, but active risk-taking is a core element of a dynamic economy and an innovative society."
