= Pre-hire assessment =

A pre-hire assessment (or pre-employment assessment) is a test or questionnaire that candidates complete as part of the job application process. The use of a valid and expert assessment is an effective way to determine which applicants are the most qualified for a specific job based on their strengths and preferences. Employers typically use the results to determine how well each candidate's strengths and preferences match the job requirements.

== Process ==
Valid pre-hire tests can be an effective means of identifying which applicants are most qualified for a particular job. Scientifically-based assessments (like cognitive and personality assessments) can improve the accuracy of recruiting and hiring processes. Using valid assessments to make decisions yields results that are more accurate than human judgment when identifying the applicants who are most likely to succeed in a job.

Based on U.S. federal guidelines and research any tool used to make a decision about a candidate is considered a “test” in the United States. That means that "test" includes résumé reviews, interviews, personality tests, cognitive tests, key word searches, sample job tasks, telephone screens, medical examinations, credit checks, and any other assessment activity like work simulations, questionnaires or assessments, and paper and pencil exercises.

The U. S. Society for Industrial and Organizational Psychology has developed information about using pre-hire tests.

Pre-hire assessments evaluate the factors that most accurately predict a candidate's future job performance. When the assessments are validated, they can be relied on to identify a candidate's strengths and work preferences. Then, using algorithms, the assessment results can be analyzed to predict how successful a candidate is likely to be in a particular job. The best assessments evaluate both cognitive ability and personality factors.

Cognitive ability is also called learning ability or “general mental ability”. This category describes the ability to learn and apply knowledge to work. Cognitive ability is a consistent and nearly universal predictor of future job performance. But cognitive ability information is not enough – some technical geniuses, for example, can't work with managers, peers, or end users. Some gifted employees cannot deliver projects on time. Personality helps explain why some employees don't perform well, even when they possess technical skills.

Personality is the unique set of characteristics that is reflected in patterns of individual behavior. Personality and its effects on work success have been studied for more than 85 years. Because personality is relatively consistent over time, using a valid pre-hire assessment helps managers learn how candidates are likely to behave when they are at work.

The use of scientific selection tools like assessments does not reduce compliance with fair employment practices or put a company at higher legal risk. “Instead, legal compliance is actually enhanced, not degraded, and is a perfect example of a win-win situation in strategic investment in HR practices.” (Handler 2007). The U.S. Uniform Guidelines on Employee Selection Procedures (1978) (Guidelines) helps organizations assure a consistent approach to selection decisions. Using the Guidelines employers can evaluate their selection procedures.

If pre-hire tools are used inappropriately, their use could violate federal anti-discrimination laws if an employer intentionally uses them to discriminate based on race, color, sex, national origin, religion, disability, or age (40 or older). The use of tests violate anti-discrimination laws if they disproportionately exclude people in protected groups like race, sex, age, or other factor, unless the employer can justify the test or procedure under the law.

Validated pre-hire assessments are designed to give managers data that is more reliable and accurate than the self-reported information from resumes and interviews. Managers who use tests early in the selection process can spend their limited time focusing on job candidates who are the most promising and likely to be good performers.

The U.S. Equal Employment Opportunity Commission (EEOC) offers guidance about using tests in the selection and promotion process. The basic reference is the Uniform Guidelines On Employee Selection Procedures. The regulations are administered by the Equal Employment Opportunity Commission. Information about selection can be found in Part 1607 – Uniform Guidelines On Employee Selection Procedures (1978).

== Practices ==
In addition the EEOC has developed a list of best practices for testing and selection.

- Employers should administer tests and other selection procedures without regard to race, color, national origin, sex, religion, age (40 or older), or disability.
- Employers should ensure that employment tests and other selection procedures are properly validated for the positions and purposes for which they are used. The test or selection procedure must be job-related and its results appropriate for the employer's purpose. While a test vendor's documentation supporting the validity of a test may be helpful, the employer is still responsible for ensuring that its tests are valid under the Uniform Guidelines on Employee Selection Procedures.
- If a selection procedure inappropriately screens out a protected group, the employer should determine whether there is an equally effective alternative selection procedure that has less adverse impact and, if so, adopt the alternative procedure. For example, if the selection procedure is a test, the employer should determine whether another test could predict job performance, but not disproportionately exclude the protected group.
- To ensure that a test or selection procedure remains predictive, employers should keep abreast of changes in their job requirements and should update the test specifications or selection procedures accordingly.
- Employers should ensure that tests (and other selection procedures) are not adopted casually by managers unless they understand the impact of these processes. A test or selection procedure can be an effective tool, but no test or selection procedure should be implemented without understanding its effectiveness and limitations, its relevance for a specific job, and whether it can be appropriately administered and scored.

== Pre-hire assessment tools ==
There are various pre-employment assessment tools for assessing psychometric skills, technical skills, cognitive skills as well as job-skills. These tools provides questionnaire in the form of Multiple Choice Questions (MCQs), case-study based, coding challenges, scenario-based, audio/video questions to make the pre-hire screening more effective. Employers should choose a right assessment tool depending on their hiring needs such as whether they want to hire for entry level or lateral recruitment, which are the skills they are hiring for, are the pre-hire assessments provided by vendor EEOC complaint, etc.
