= Process risk =

- Field: Risk management; Operations management; Business processes
- Purpose: Risk of losses arising from ineffective and/or inefficient processes that support business activities, potentially leading to financial, customer, or reputational impact.

Process Risk is considered to be a sub-component of operational risk. It exists when the process that supports a business activity lacks both efficiency and effectiveness, which may then lead to financial, customer, and reputational loss. This form of risk may be present within any stage of a business transaction. For instance, an error in pricing may be seen as loss in sales revenue, while a disruption in the fulfillment process may cause financial losses in terms of production quality and customer relationships. The majority of operational risk events occur due to losses from ineffective processing of business transactions or process management, and from inadequate relations with trade counter parties and vendors.

== Definition ==
Process risk is a loss in revenue as a result of ineffective and/or inefficient processes. Ineffective processes hamper the achievement of the organization's objectives, whereas the processes that are inefficient, may be successful in achieving objectives, yet fail to consider high costs incurred.

== Forms ==
=== In fulfillment ===
- The process risk in fulfillment is negatively related to the supply chain performance. That means a fulfillment problem may cause a loss of customers to the company. For example, a company that lacks sound manufacturing processes may not efficiently fulfill customer orders which may undermine the performance of the business. Any disruptions in the production process should be treated as a threat to the company's relationship with current and potential customers. Thus, an increase in process risk is associated with a decrease in the supply chain performance.

=== In documentations ===
- The risk of loss due to erroneous documentation processes is especially common within the banking industry. For instance, banks generate a mass amount of documentations. Any informational error or inaccurate input of data within the documents may overall weaken the effectiveness of financial contracts, and this form of risk may also overlap other risk, such as legal risk.

== Mitigation ==
It is difficult to eliminate all process risk due to the high dependency on complex environments and the high input of human resources. Certain business practices applied to its processes, such as standardization, is an example of how to minimize operational risk. Furthermore, information systems aid in gathering information about process risk events.

Event logs is one approach to mitigate process risk. The use of events logs can help risk managers oversee and evaluate a consolidated database with all associated process risk. This approach does not completely eliminate process risk, yet it is a tool for the evaluation of the overall risk exposure so that the company may be able track and manage the risk linked to the overall business processes.

Another possible approach would be to implement a collaborative approach within the operational processes of a business. In other words, the process risk in the supply chain may be mitigated through collaboration. For example, the use of this approach is said to help establish a strong communication channel throughout the supply chain. The objective is to reduce process risk by directly working with suppliers. The desired outcome would be to improve quality and communication between all parties involved in the supply chain, which then reduces the risk of losing customers.

In addition, the establishment of a measurement framework may be used to improve the management of process risk. The framework should function as the means to identify and control process risk. These measures include, and are not limited to, adding internal processing controls on all business transactions, and increasing training and development to improve quality control.
