= Luis A. Seco =

Director of RiskLab

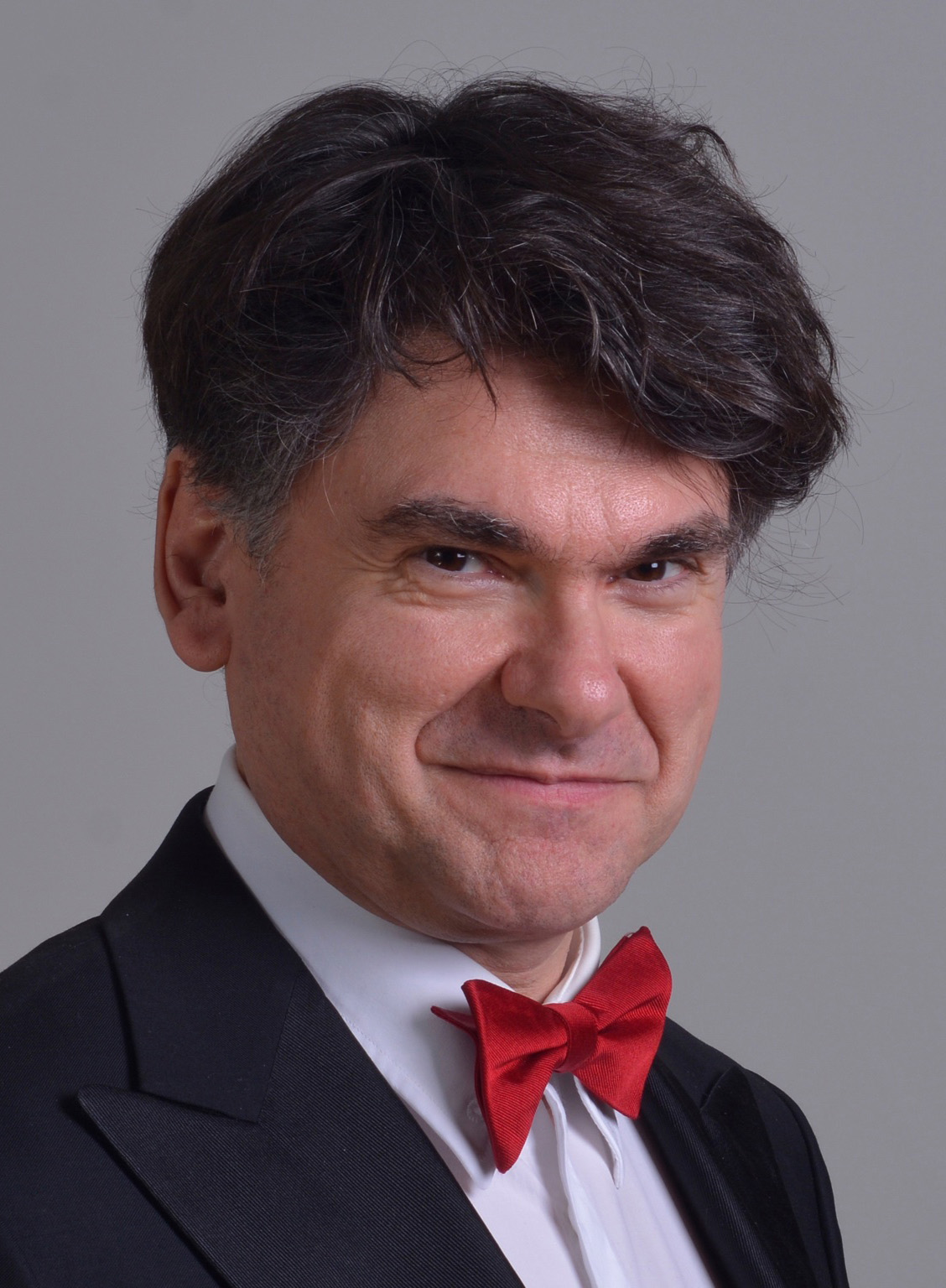
Luis A. Seco

Luis A. Seco is a Spanish economist and mathematician who is the director of Canadian-based RiskLab, a global-based laboratory headquartered in Toronto that conducts research in financial risk management. Seco is also president and CEO of Sigma Analysis & Management Ltd and professor of mathematics at the University of Toronto Mississauga.

== Career ==
He is the director of the Mathematical Finance Program at the University of Toronto.

Seco holds a Ph.D. from Princeton University, under Charles Fefferman. Seco has taught as a Bateman Instructor in Mathematics at California Institute of Technology, and has been a visiting professor at the Mittag-Leffler Institute, Universidad Autónoma de Madrid, Schrödinger Institute, Paris Dauphine University, University of Texas at Austin, and Princeton University

In July 2019, the University of Toronto's Fields Institute for Research in Mathematical Sciences announced the appointment of Professor Luis Seco as Director of the Fields Centre for Quantitative Analysis and Modelling (Fields CQAM) through to July 2020.

== Publications ==
In September 2020, Seco contributed to the paper "Integrating health and economic parameters to optimize COVID-19 mitigation strategies" published in Issue 50 of the Centre for Economic Policy Research's Covid Economics, Vetted and Real-Time Papers.

In November 2020, Seco contributed a feature to Spain's national newspaper El País on the subject of mathematically modelling the spread of the COVID-19.

In February 2023, Seco was contacted by The Canadian Press to provide commentary regarding the Government of New Brunswick's announcement that it would be capping financial compensation for properties that repeatedly experience damage from climate-related disasters.

== Recognition ==
In December 2011, Seco received the Caballero de la Orden del Mérito Civil (Knight of the Order of Civil Merit) award from the Government of Spain for his application of mathematics to foresee economic cycles.
