= RiskLab =

Canadian research laboratory

- Founded: 1994
- Type: Research Laboratory
- Purpose: Financial risk management
- Location: Toronto, Ontario, Canada, Miami, Florida
- Origins: Eidgenössische Technische Hochschule Zürich, Zurich, Switzerland
- Region served: Worldwide
- Key people: Luis A. Seco, Director

RiskLab is a laboratory that conducts research in financial risk management.

The first RiskLab was created in 1994 at Eidgenössische Technische Hochschule Zürich in Zurich, Switzerland. The ethos of all existing RiskLabs is a fusion of academic research, industrial innovation and governmental oversight in financial risk management.

In 1996, another RiskLab was created independently at the University of Toronto, this time sponsored by the private company Algorithmics Incorporated.

Shortly afterwards, and also in partnership with Algorithmics Inc, other RiskLabs were created in Munich (1997), at Cornell University (1998), at University of Cambridge (1998), at the Universidad Autonoma de Madrid (2000),Cyprus International Institute of Management in Nicosia (2001), and Florida International University (2023).

In 2005, RiskLab Toronto, a divisional center at the University of Toronto, was featured in Research Means Business, a directory of "cutting-edge research leading to industrial innovation and the creation of new business enterprises" published by the Natural Sciences and Engineering Research Council of Canada (NSERC).

Risklab China Research Center was also created in 2006.

In October 2007, RiskLab was the NSERC Synergy Award for Innovation. The award was delivered by Dr. Colin Carrie, Parliamentary Secretary to the Minister of Industry, on behalf of the Honourable Jim Prentice, Minister of Industry and Minister responsible for the Natural Sciences and Engineering Research Council of Canada (NSERC), and by Dr. Suzanne Fortier, President of NSERC.

In 2010, growing out of the RiskLab international network, RiskLabs built the strategic alliance named RiskLab Global.

In 2013, a Finnish section of Risklab was independently created at Åbo Akademi University in Turku and Arcada University of Applied Sciences in Helsinki.

In 2022, the Miami Chapter of RiskLab was created at Florida International University. This chapter focuses on cutting-edge research leading to industrial innovation and the collaboration with business enterprises. They focus on providing their students with knowledge for resumes and interviews preparations, while finding information about internships and experience from people that are directly working in the industry.

RiskLab Australia at CSIRO's Data61 was launched in 2015, based in Melbourne. RiskLab Australia at CSIRO's Data61 is a multi-disciplinary R&D centre for developing the latest methodologies and technologies in actuarial sciences, econometrics, applied math and statistics as well as financial mathematics.

== Global organization structure ==
RiskLab Toronto, Canada Chapter, Headquarter Institution: University of Toronto, Toronto Metropolitan University

Members:

- Luis A. Seco, Professor of Mathematics,; Director of RiskLab - Toronto; President and CEO of Sigma Analysis and Management Ltd.
- Alan Peng, Ph.D., CFA, Managing Director for Education and International Cooperation Development, Faculty of Mathematical Finance.
- Marcos Escobar, Associate Professor, Toronto Metropolitan University
- Pablo Olivares, Assistant Professor, Toronto Metropolitan University
- Sebastian Ferrando, Professor, Toronto Metropolitan University
