= Manufactured risk =

Risks created by modernisation

Manufactured risks are risks that are produced by the modernization process, particularly by innovative developments in science and technology. They create risk environments that have little historical reference, and are therefore largely unpredictable. Manufactured risk produces a risk society.

The transition from external to manufactured risk can be described as "At a certain point, however – very recently in historical terms – we started worrying less about what nature can do to us, and more about what we have done to nature."
