= External risk =

Risks that are uncontrollable by the first party

External risks are generally something that is uncontrollable by the first party.

== In contract law ==
In contract law, are risks that are produced by a non-human source and are beyond human control. They are unexpected but happen regularly enough in a general population to be broadly predictable, and may be the subject of casualty insurance. Good examples of external risks are natural disasters such as earthquakes and volcanoes.

Insurance adjusters analyze external risks on a normal basis. Measuring risks of the environment is common practice throughout insurance claims. As far as claims go, most external risks, or an "Act of God", are protected by property insurance.

== In project management ==
In project management; Risks that are external to the project and the project manager cannot control. Good examples of external risks are changes in government legislation, changes in strategy from senior managers, and the economy.

== Assessing external risks ==
Three separate aspects should be analyzed when determining the amount of external risk that exists.

1. Frequency of Occurrence - What are the odds of an external risk occurring in your situation? Do similar risk situations happen often in your area? This assesses the probability of the external risk.
2. Duration of the Occurrence - Over what time period will the external risk last? How long will the affected party be at an altered state due to this risk? This assesses the amount of time that would be lost due to the risk and its effects.
3. Loss of Assets - What types of property could be damaged or destroyed from this risk? This assesses the state of property and assets after the external risk occurs.

== See also ==
- Force majeure
- Act of God
- Mutual assent
- Contract law
- Impossibility of performance
