= Macro risk =

Macro risk is financial risk that is associated with macroeconomic or political factors. There are at least three different ways this phrase is applied. It can refer to economic or financial risk found in stocks and funds, to political risk found in different countries, and to the impact of economic or financial variables on political risk. Macro risk can also refer to types of economic factors which influence the volatility over time of investments, assets, portfolios, and the intrinsic value of companies.

Macro risk associated with stocks, funds, and portfolios is usually of concern to financial planners, securities traders, and investors with longer time horizons. Some of the macroeconomic variables that generate macro risk include unemployment rates, price indexes, monetary policy variables, interest rates, exchange rates, housing starts, agricultural exports, and even prices of raw materials such as gold.

Models that incorporate macro risk are generally of two types. One type focuses on how short-term changes in macro risk factors impact stock returns. These models include the arbitrage pricing theory and the modern portfolio theory families of models.

The other models that incorporate macro risk data are valuation models or the closely related fundamental analysis models. Used primarily by those focusing on longer term investments including wealth managers, financial planners, and some institutional investors, these models are examples of intrinsic value analysis. In such analysis, forecasts of future company earnings are used to estimate the current and expected value of the investment being studied. Macro risk factors include any economic variables that are used to construct these estimates.

Understanding that macro risk factors influence the intrinsic value of a particular investment is important because when the factors change values, errors can be introduced in the corresponding intrinsic value forecasts. Investors who follow the Black Swan Theory may try to reduce the overall exposure of their investments to different macro risk factors in order to reduce the impact of economic shocks. This may be accomplished using commercial portfolio optimization tools or by using mathematical programming methods.

Another way macro risk is used is to differentiate between countries as potential places to invest. In this meaning, the level of a country's macro risk differentiates its level of political stability and its general growth opportunities from those of other countries, and thus helps identify preferred countries for investment either directly or through country or regionally oriented funds. Such analysis of political risk is also used for the purposes of credit insurance on foreign sales and in other financial analysis such as credit default swaps and other sophisticated financial products. International rankings of countries, often updated annually, provide insight into their relative political and social stability and economic growth.

A new application of macro risk is essentially a converse of the first two meanings; it refers to how macroeconomics and fluctuations in financial variables generate political risk. For example, economic turbulence that leads to higher or lower levels of approval for the president's policies would be a form of this macro risk.
