= Downside risk =

Risk of the actual return being below the expected return

Downside risk is the financial risk associated with losses. That is, it is the risk of the actual return being below the expected return, or the uncertainty about the magnitude of that difference.

Risk measures typically quantify the downside risk, whereas the standard deviation (an example of a deviation risk measure) measures both the upside and downside risk. Specifically, downside risk can be measured either with downside beta or by measuring lower semi-deviation. The statistic below-target semi-deviation or simply target semi-deviation (TSV) has become the industry standard.

== History ==
Downside risk was first modeled by Roy (1952), who assumed that an investor's goal was to minimize his/her risk. This mean-semivariance, or downside risk, model is also known as "safety-first" technique, and only looks at the lower standard deviations of expected returns which are the potential losses. This is about the same time Harry Markowitz was developing mean-variance theory. Even Markowitz, himself, stated that "semi-variance is the more plausible measure of risk" than his mean-variance theory. Later in 1970, several focus groups were performed where executives from eight industries were asked about their definition of risk resulting in semi-variance being a better indicator than ordinary variance. Then, through a theoretical analysis of capital market values, Hogan and Warren demonstrated that 'the fundamental structure of the "capital-asset pricing model is retained when standard semideviation is substituted for standard deviation to measure portfolio risk."' This shows that the CAPM can be modified by incorporating downside beta, which measures downside risk, in place of regular beta to correctly reflect what people perceive as risk. Since the early 1980s, when Dr. Frank Sortino developed formal definition of downside risk as a better measure of investment risk than standard deviation, downside risk has become the industry standard for risk management.

== Downside risk vs. capital asset pricing model ==
It is important to distinguish between downside and upside risk because security distributions are non-normal and non-symmetrical. This is in contrast to what the capital asset pricing model (CAPM) assumes: that security distributions are symmetrical, and thus that downside and upside betas for an asset are the same. Since investment returns tend to have a non-normal distribution, however, there in fact tend to be different probabilities for losses than for gains. The probability of losses is reflected in the downside risk of an investment, or the lower portion of the distribution of returns. The CAPM, however, includes both halves of a distribution in its calculation of risk. Because of this it has been argued that it is crucial to not simply rely upon the CAPM, but rather to distinguish between the downside risk, which is the risk concerning the extent of losses, and upside risk, or risk concerning the extent of gains. Studies indicate that "around two-thirds of the time standard beta would underestimate the downside risk."

== Examples ==
- Value at Risk
- Average value at risk
- The semivariance is defined as the expected squared deviation from the mean, calculated over those points that are no greater than the mean. Its square root is the semi-deviation:

$$SD(X) = \left(\mathbb{E}[(X - \mathbb{E}[X])^2 1_{\{X \leq \mathbb{E}[X]\}}]\right)^{\frac{1}{2}}$$
where $1_{\{X \leq \mathbb{E}[X]\}}$ is an indicator function, i.e.
$$1_{\{X \leq \mathbb{E}[X]\}} = \begin{cases}1 & \text{if } X \leq \mathbb{E}[X]\\ 0 & \text{else}\end{cases}$$

- Below target semi-deviation for target $t$ defined by

$$TSV(X,t) = \left(\mathbb{E}[(X - t)^2 1_{\{X \leq t\}}]\right)^{\frac{1}{2}}$$.

== See also ==
- Efficient contract theory – Hypothesis in microeconomics
- Financial risk – Any of various types of risk associated with financing
- Post-modern portfolio theory – Portfolio theory
