= Downside beta =

In investing, downside beta measures how a stock's returns move in relation to the market's returns only during periods when the market underperforms a specified target level, usually the risk-free rate or zero. Downside beta was developed by Hogan and Warren (1974) and later by Bawa and Lindenberg (1977). They extended CAPM to account for investor preferences toward downside risk rather than total variance — leading to the Downside-CAPM (D-CAPM).

== Formula ==
It is common to measure $r_i$ and $r_m$ as the excess returns to security $i$ and the market $m$, $u_m$ as the average market excess return, and Cov and Var as the covariance and variance operators, Downside beta is

$$\beta^-=\frac{\operatorname{Cov}(r_i,r_m \mid r_m<u_m)}{\operatorname{Var}(r_m \mid r_m<u_m)},$$

while upside beta is given by this expression with the direction of the inequalities reversed. Therefore, $\beta^-$ can be estimated with a regression of the excess return of security $i$ on the excess return of the market, conditional on (excess) market return being negative.

== Downside beta vs. beta ==
Downside beta was once hypothesized to have greater explanatory power than standard beta in bearish markets. As such, it would have been a better measure of risk than ordinary beta.

== Use in equilibrium models of risk-reward ==
The capital asset pricing model (CAPM) can be modified to work with dual betas. Other researchers have attempted to use semi-variance instead of standard deviation to measure risk.
