= Legal risk =

Type of operational risk

Legal risk as a subset of operational risk that comprises the uncertainty associated with a business becoming a subjects of legal liability and obligations as a result of its operation.

One of the primary reasons why legal risk is associated with operational risk involves fraud since it is recognized as the most significant category of operational loss events and considered to be a legal issue as well. This, however, does not mean that legal risk is only confined to this conceptualization. For instance, there are specific sets of legal risks that are defined by European Union (EU) Law. In 2005, the European Central Bank declared that it will develop its own legal risk definition to help "facilitate proper risk assessment and risk management, as well as ensure a consistent approach between EU credit institutions."

Further developing legitimate risk the board for any organization does not require many steps. This process won't prevent each lawsuit or administrative punishment, however, it can reduce lawful risks and enhance the organization's responses.

Hazard is intrinsic in any business undertaking, and great danger management is a fundamental part of maintaining a fruitful business. An organization's management has shifting degrees of control concerning hazards. A few dangers can be straightforwardly overseen; different dangers are largely outside the ability to control organization management. Everything an organization can manage is to attempt to expect potential dangers, survey the possible effect on the organization's business, and be ready with an arrangement to respond to unfavorable occasions.

== Definitions ==
There is no standard definition, but there are at least two primary/secondary definition sets in circulation.

McCormick, R. 2004

Legal risk is the risk of loss to an institution which is primarily caused by:
(a) a defective transaction; or
(b) a claim (including a defense to a claim or a counterclaim) being made or some other event occurring which results in a liability for the institution or other loss (for example, as a result of the termination of a contract) or;
(c) failing to take appropriate measures to protect assets (for example, intellectual property) owned by the institution; or
(d) change in law.

McCormick, R. 2004

Management of legal risk is not a precise science and subjective to the situation of the institution, and primarily caused by the lack of proper communication channel, undefined institutional objectives (such as the lack of policies and regulations), unclarified information flow between different personnel and department, lack of delegation of power to specify task on mitigation of risks.

Johnson & Swanson. 2007

The expenses of litigation of a company.

Whalley, M. 2016

Legal risk is the risk of financial or reputational loss that can result from lack of awareness or misunderstanding of, ambiguity in, or reckless indifference to, the way law and regulation apply to your business, its relationships, processes, products and services.

Tsui TC. 2013

The cost and loss of income caused by legal uncertainty, multiplied by possibility of the individual event or legal environment as a whole. One of the most obvious legal risks of doing business not mentioned in the above definitions is the risk of arrest and prosecution.

== Types ==
- Regulatory Risks turning into legal risks: These are the risks that arise out of regulations and laws that govern a business organization or the market in which it operates. Every country and the government lays down certain laws and regulations for the proper operations of the businesses. And all the businesses have to comply with those rules and regulations of the land. Moreover, any non-compliance can have serious consequences for any organization. Therefore legal expenses insurance may be used to mitigate this risk.
- Compliance Risk: The potential for fines and penalties for an organization that fails to comply with laws regulations.
- Contract Risk: The potential for a partner, customer or supplier to fail to meet the terms of a contract resulting in losses. Contract risk can also result from the failure to meet the terms of a contract resulting in penalties or legal disputes.
- Non-contractual Rights: The potential for a third party to infringe on its non-contractual obligations.
- Dispute Risk: The potential for a legal dispute to arise as a result of business activities.
- Reputational risk: The potential of the decline of reputation due to legal actions.

== Consequences ==
Legal risk can lead to fines and administrative penalties, the need for monetary damages, deterioration of reputation, deterioration of the bank's market position, narrowing opportunities for development, reducing the opportunities for development or legal enforcement of agreements.
