= Rotunda =

Building with a circular ground plan

Cross-section of the Pantheon's rotunda

A rotunda (from Latin rotundus) is any roofed building with a circular ground plan, and sometimes covered by a dome. It may also refer to a round room within a building (an example being the one below the dome of the United States Capitol in Washington, D.C.). The Pantheon in Rome is perhaps the most famous, and is the most influential rotunda. A band rotunda is a circular bandstand, usually with a dome.

== Classical architecture ==
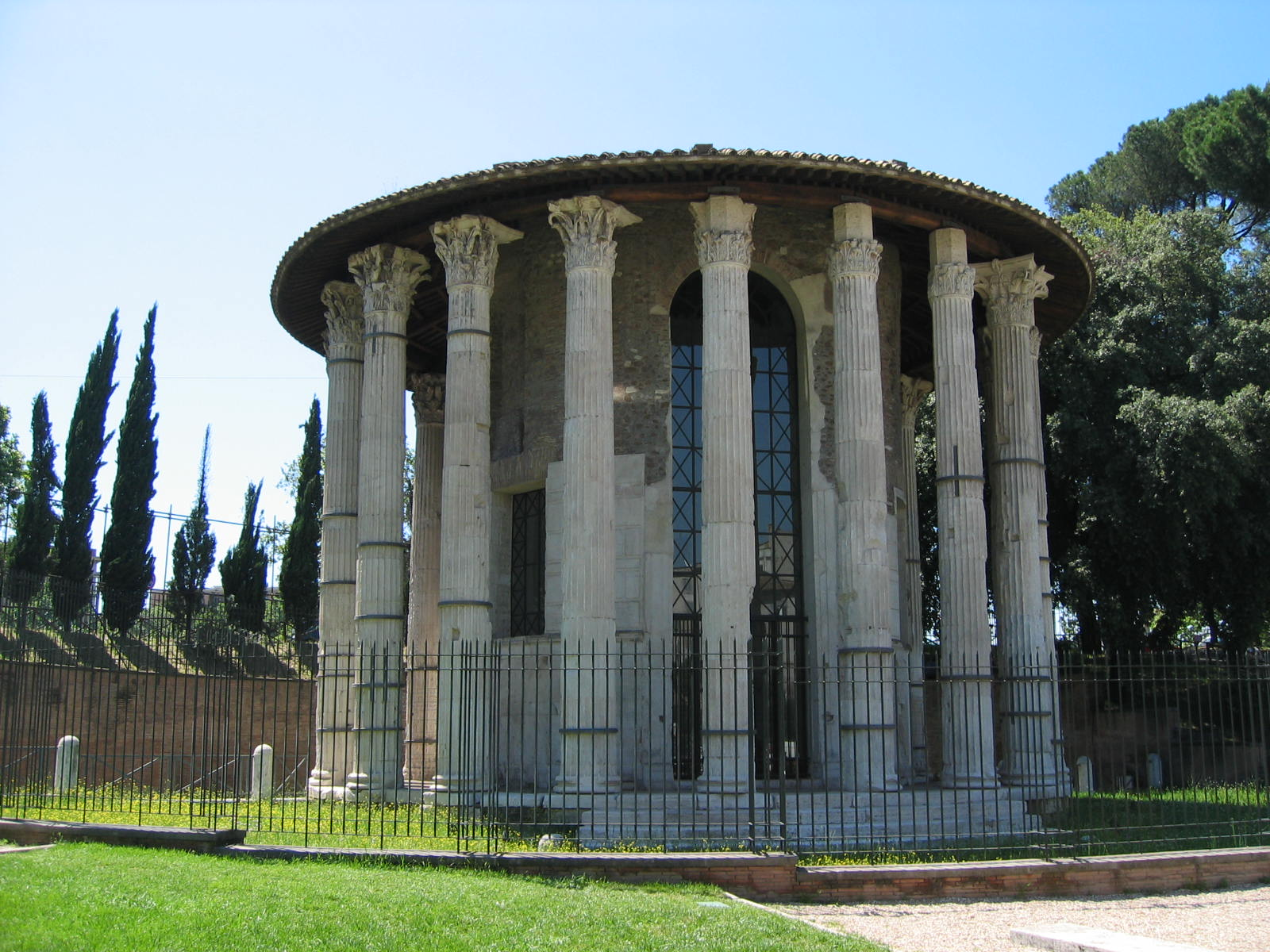
Temple of Hercules Victor, in the Forum Boarium in Rome

The terminology of Ancient Greek architecture and Roman architecture distinguishes between two types of rotunda: a tholos is enclosed by a wall, while a monopteros is just a circular colonnade with a roof (like a modern bandstand or park pavilion). It is not clear that any Greek example was actually a Greek temple, but several were Roman temples, though mostly much smaller than the Pantheon, and with very different designs. The Temple of Hercules Victor and Temple of Vesta in Rome, along with the Temple of Vesta, Tivoli, are the best known and best preserved examples.

The few large Greek tholoi had varied functions, not all of which are now clear. Several are at major religious sanctuaries, but seem not to have been conventional temples. At most only the foundations and a few columns remain in place. They include the Tholos of Delphi, the Philippeion at Olympia, a small memorial to the family of Philip of Macedon, and a large building at the Sanctuary of Asclepius, Epidaurus. The largest Greek tholos, of uncertain function, was built in the Samothrace temple complex in the 260s BC. It is often called the Arsinoeum, as a dedication tablet for the Ptolomeic Queen Arsinoe II of Egypt has survived. The sanctuary was a great Hellenistic centre of Greco-Roman mysteries and the building probably played some role in these.

The oldest, the Tholos of Athens, was a large and plain rotunda used as a dining hall, and perhaps more, by the city's ruling council.

Later, very large, Roman rotundas include the Castel Sant'Angelo in Rome, built in the 130s as a mausoleum for the emperor Hadrian, and in the Middle Ages turned into a castle, and the 4th-century Rotunda in Thessaloniki, probably also intended as an imperial mausoleum, but later used as a church and a mosque. The church of Santa Costanza in Rome is a circular funerary chapel of the 4th century, probably built for one or more of the daughters of Constantine the Great, originally placed next to a funerary hall that is now only a ruined wall.

== India ==
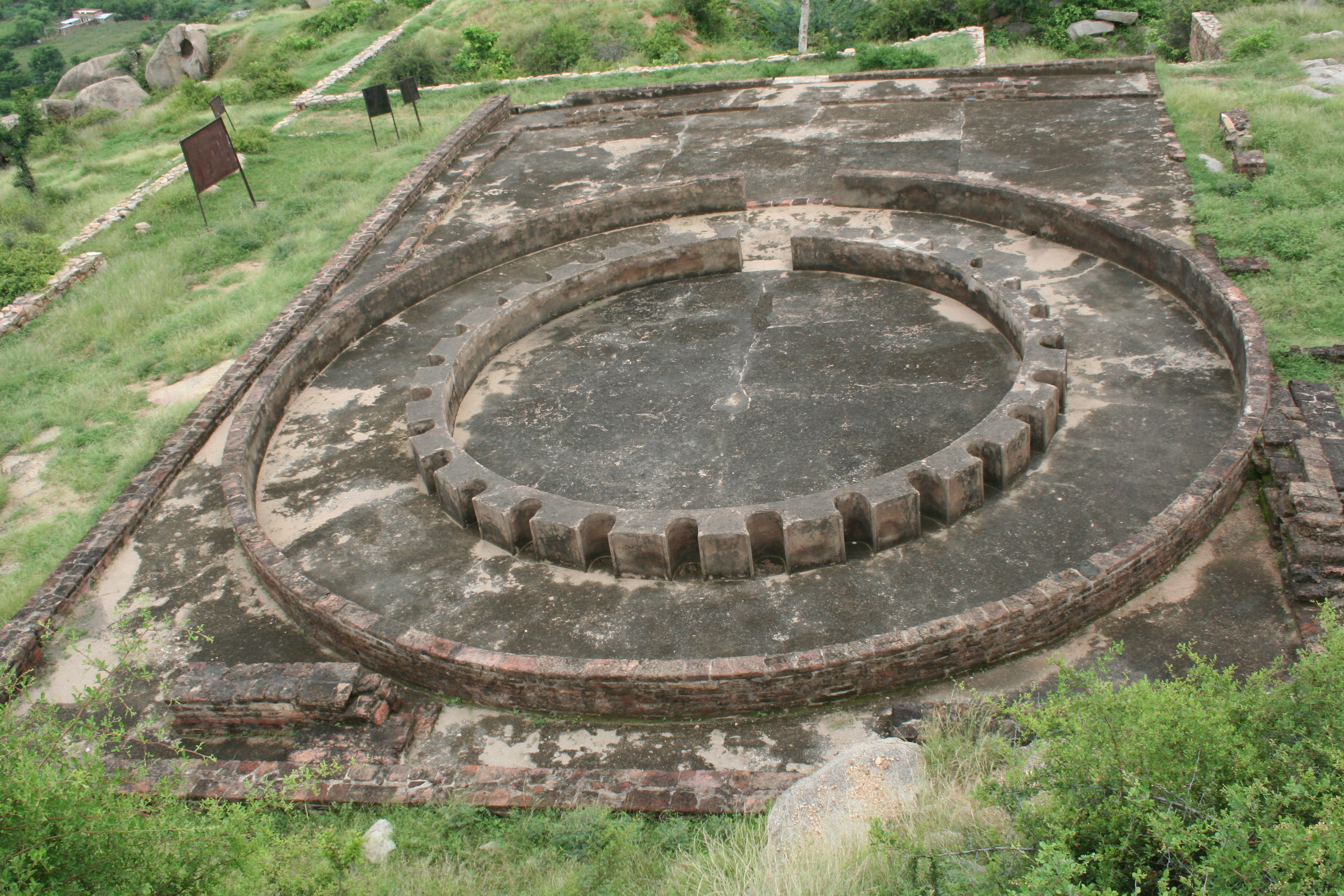
Remains of the circular temple at Bairat. A stupa was located in the center, with a colonnade and a circular wall around. 3rd century BCE.

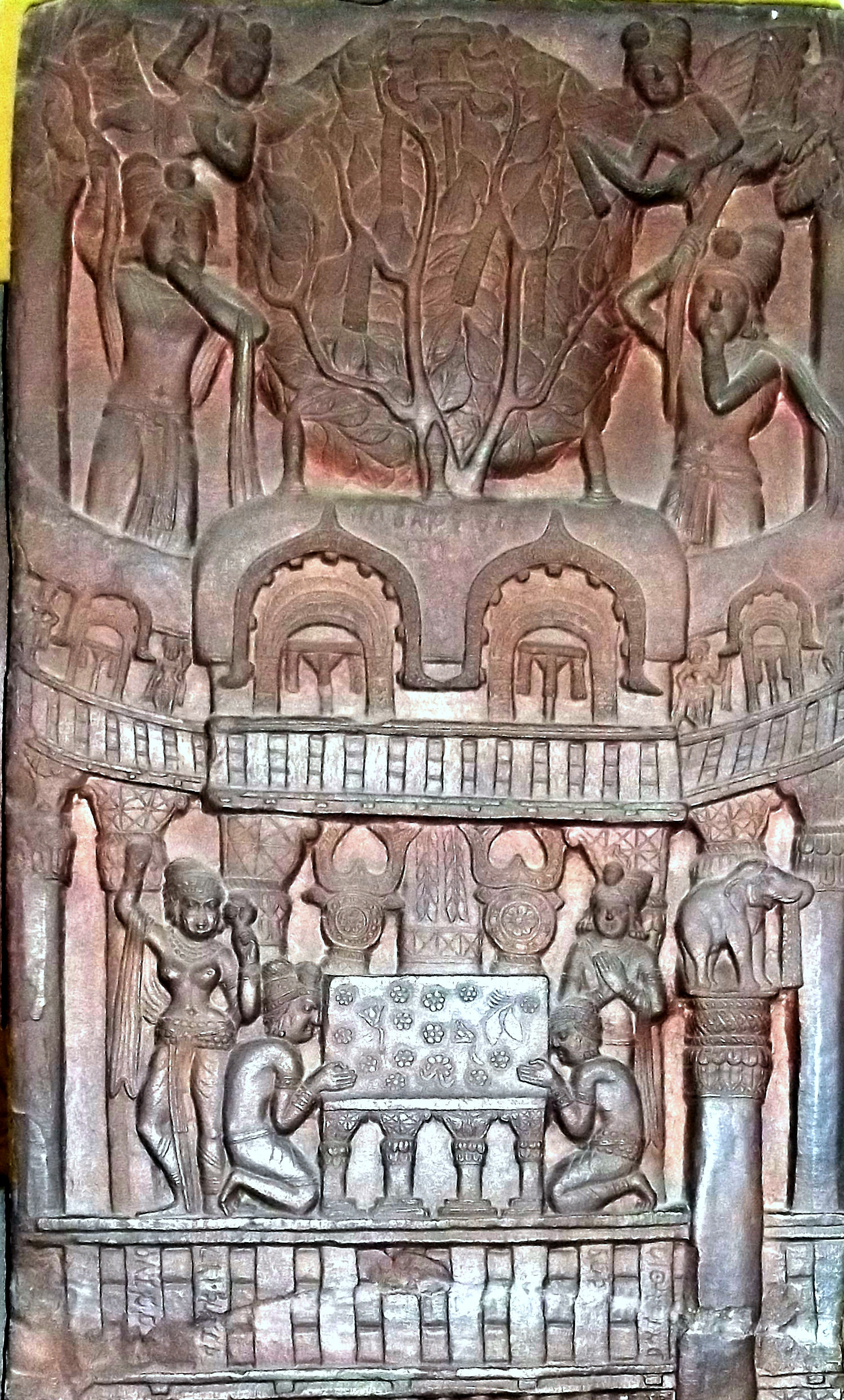
Ashoka's circular Mahabodhi Temple, Bharhut

Some of the earliest free-standing temples in India are thought to have been of a circular type, as the Buddhist Bairat Temple in Bairat, Rajasthan, formed of a central stupa surrounded by a circular colonnade and an enclosing wall, built during the time of Emperor Ashoka and near which were found several Minor Rock Edicts. Ashoka also built the Mahabodhi Temple in Bodh Gaya circa 250 BC, possibly also a circular structure, next to the Bodhi tree. Representations of this early temple structure are found on a 100 BCE relief from the stupa railing at Bhārhut, as well as in Sanchi. These circular-type temples were also found in later rock-hewn caves such as Tulja Caves or Guntupalli. Circularity in Buddhist architecture was generally to allow a path for pradakshina or devotional circling of a round and solid stupa.

It has been suggested that these circular structures with colonnades may have originated with the Greek circular tholos temple, as in the Tholos of Delphi, but circular wooden huts in India are a more likely source of inspiration.

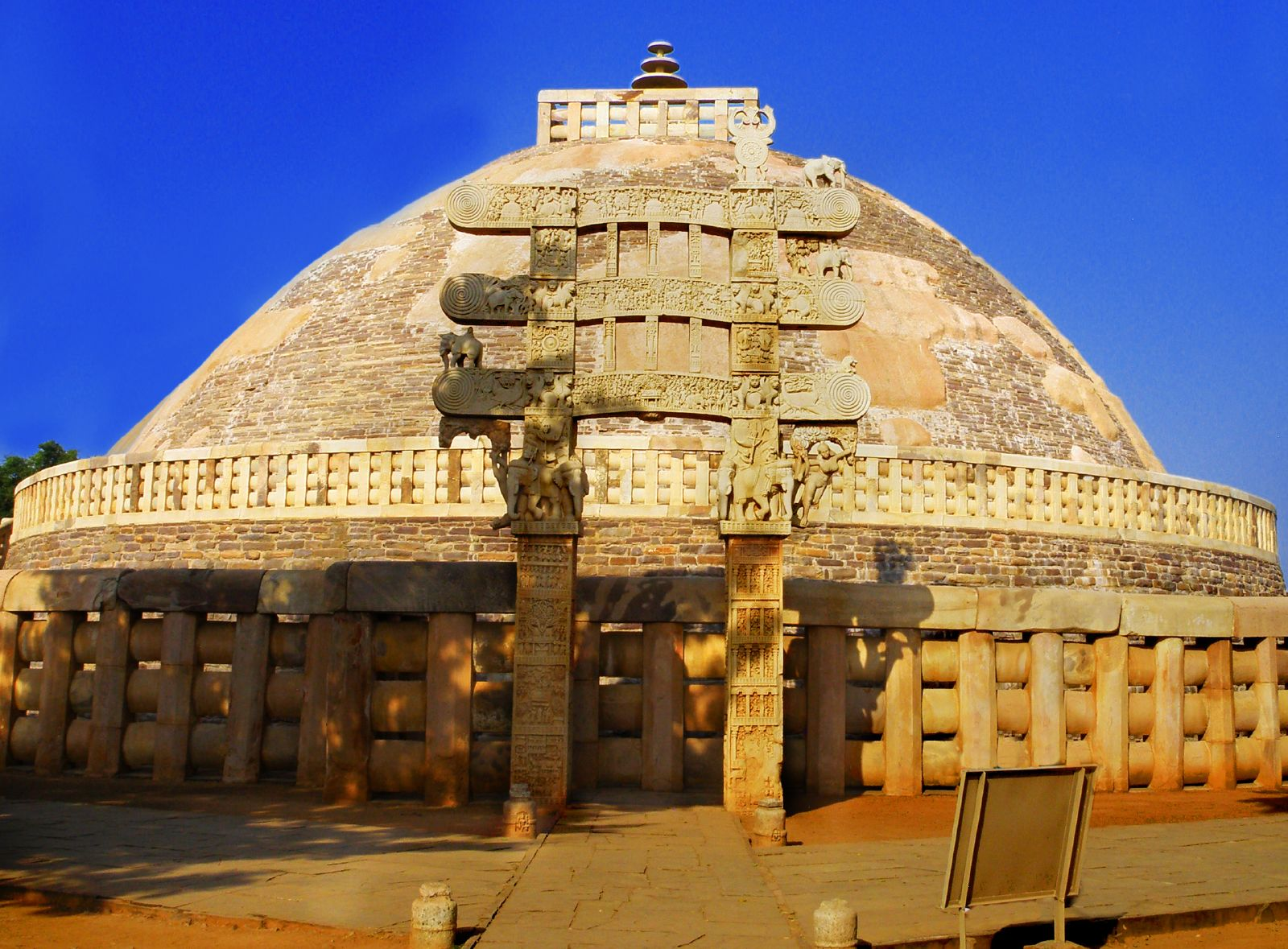
Sanchi Stupa in India, a Buddhist pilgrimage site

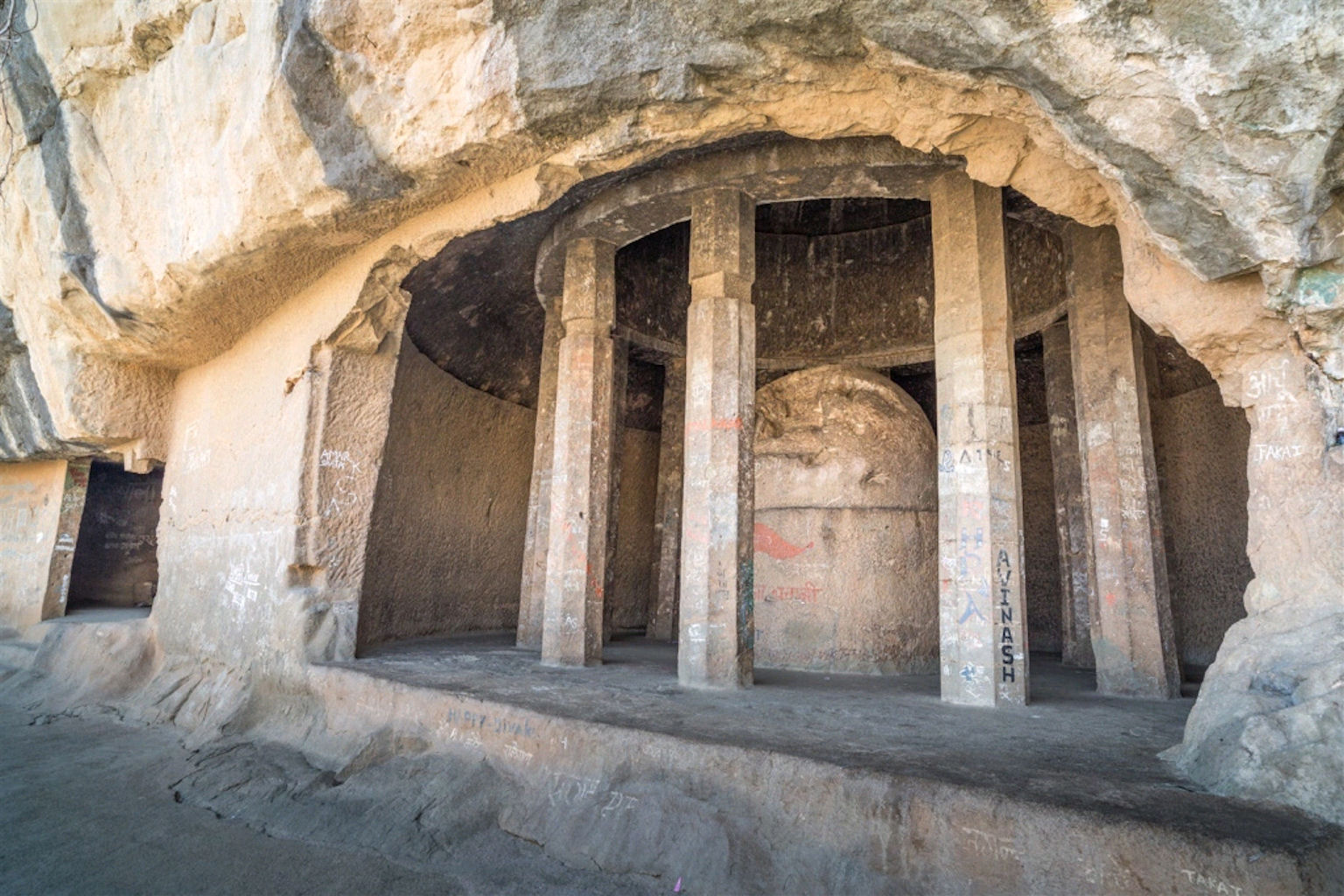
Remains of a circular Chaitya, Tulja Caves

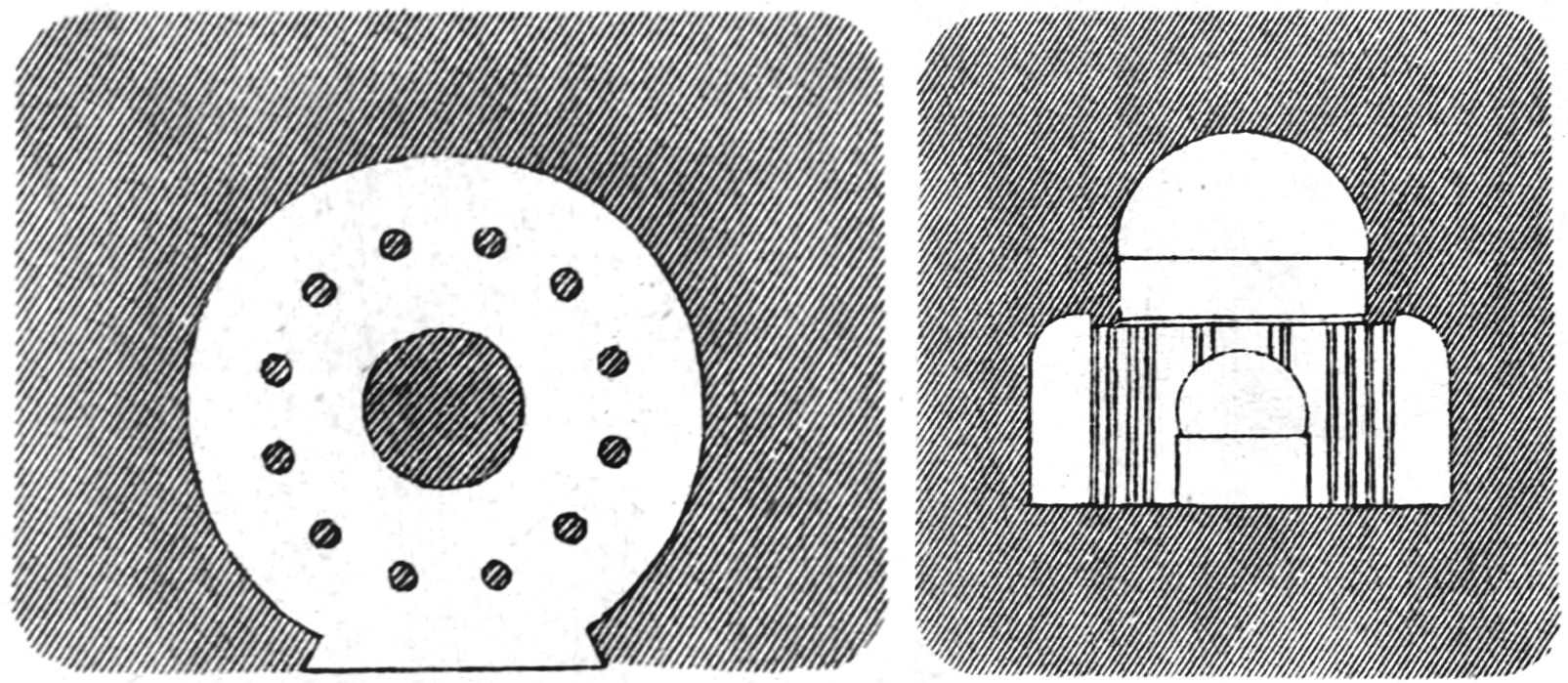
Tulja Lena Chaitya, plan and elevation

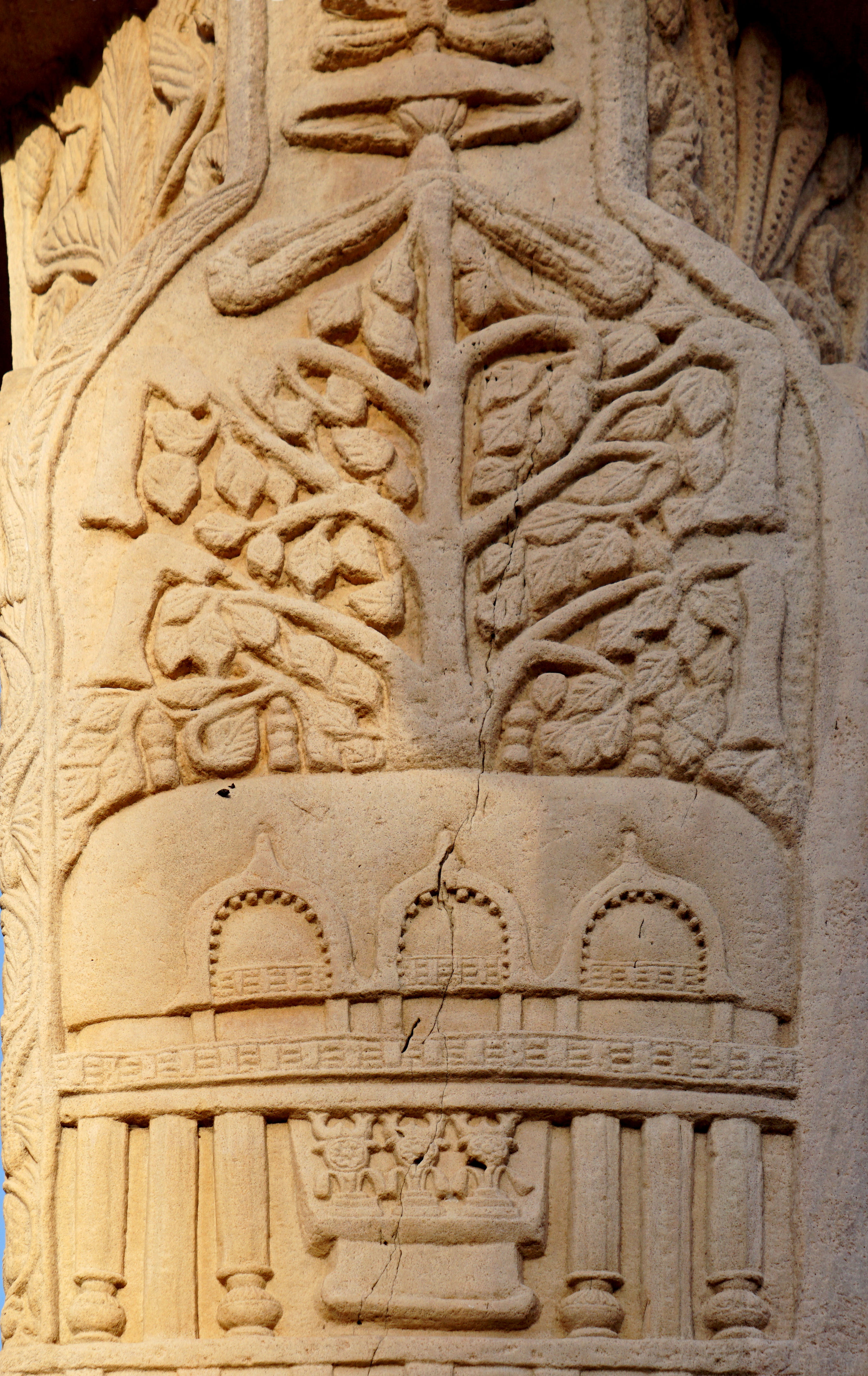
Sanchi depiction of the Mahabodhi Temple

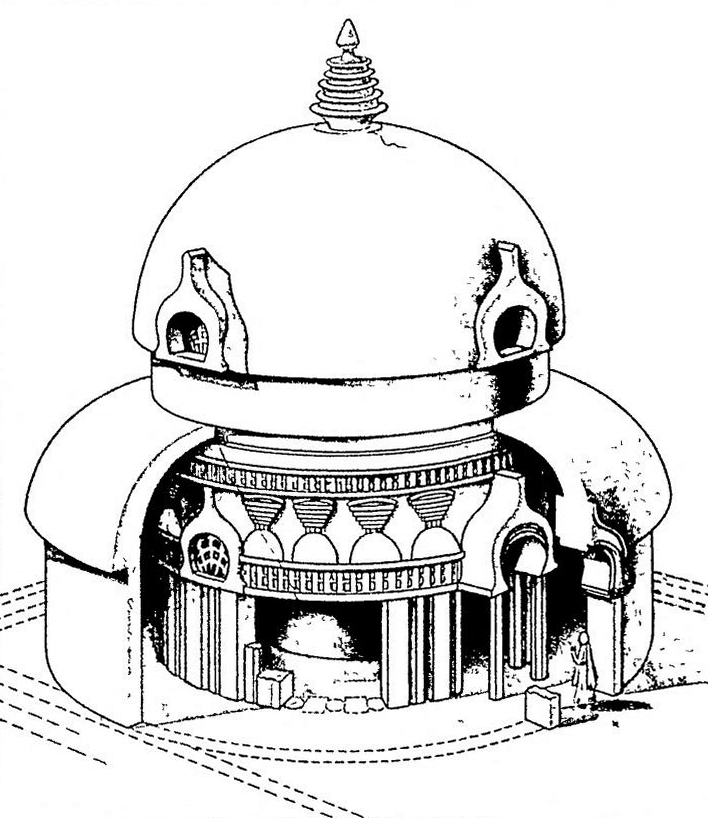
Reconstruction of the Bairat Temple

== Medieval and Renaissance Europe ==
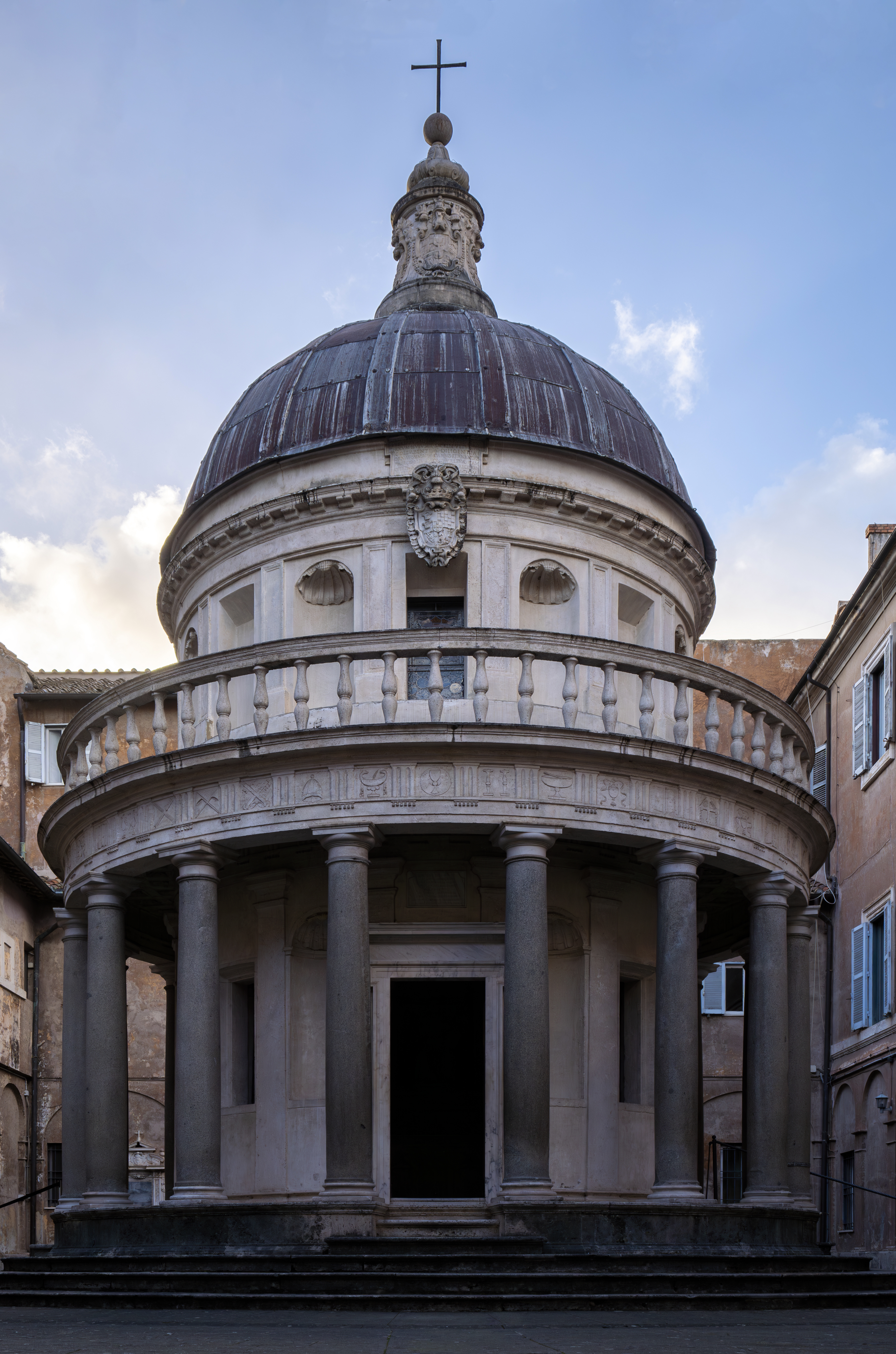
The Tempietto at San Pietro in Montorio, Rome by Donato Bramante c. 1502

The Pisa Baptistery is the outstanding late medieval rotunda, taking from 1152 to 1363 to build, and including Romanesque, Gothic and classicizing or Proto-Renaissance elements. There are a number of other round churches.

The rotunda with columns was revived in one of the most influential buildings in Renaissance architecture, the Tempietto in a courtyard of the church of San Pietro in Montorio in Rome. This was designed by Donato Bramante around 1502 in strongly classicizing style. It is a small building whose innovation, as far as Western Europe was concerned, was to use the tholos form as the base for a dome above; this may have reflected a Byzantine structure in Jerusalem over the tomb of Christ. The Roman Temple of Vesta (which has no dome) was probably also an influence. This pairing of tholos, now called a drum or tholobate, and dome became extremely popular raised high above main structures which were often based on the Roman temple.

== Central Europe ==
A great number of parochial churches were built in this form in the 9th to 11th centuries CE in Central Europe. These round churches can be found in great number in Hungary, Poland, Slovakia, Croatia (particularly Dalmatia), Austria, Bavaria, Germany, and the Czech Republic. It was thought of as a structure descending from the Roman Pantheon. However, it can be found mainly not on former Roman territories, but in Central Europe. Generally its size was 6–9 meters inner diameter and the apse was directed toward the east. Sometimes three or four apses were attached to the central circle and this type has relatives even in the Caucasus.

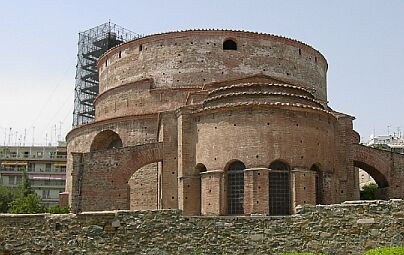
The famous Rotunda church in Thessaloniki, Greece

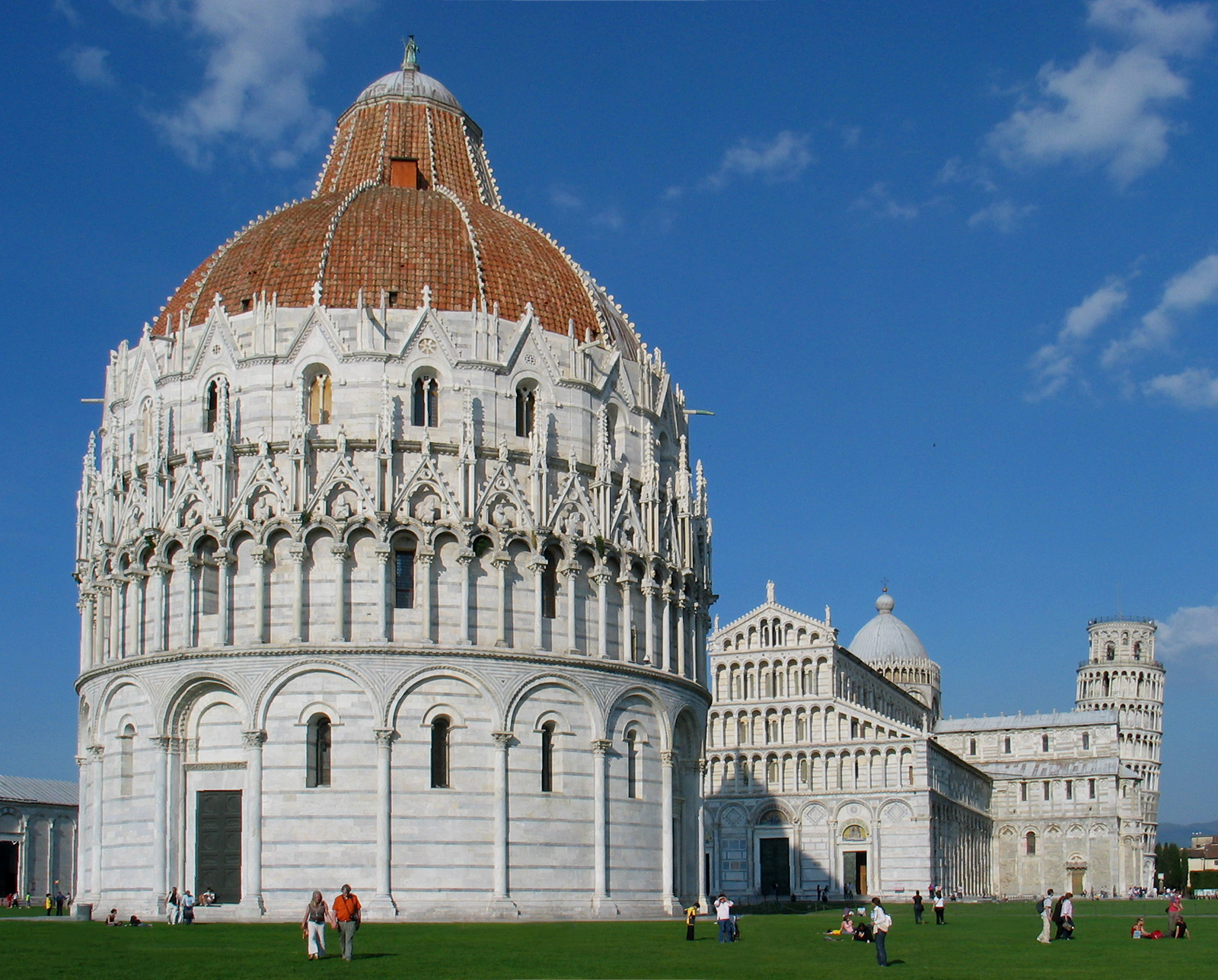
The Pisa Baptistery at the Piazza dei Miracoli, Pisa, Italy

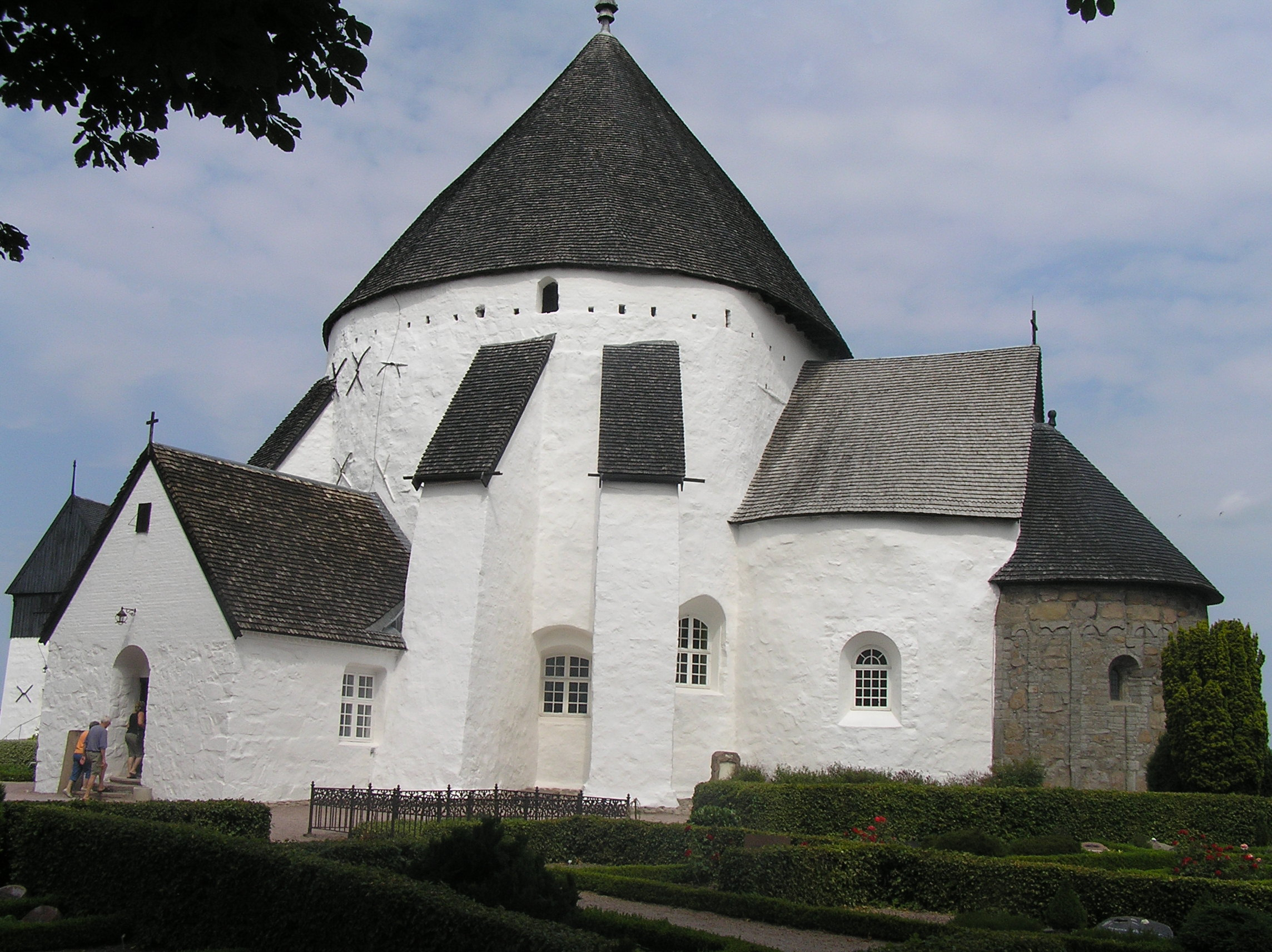
The most well known Danish rotunda is the village parochial church at Østerlars.

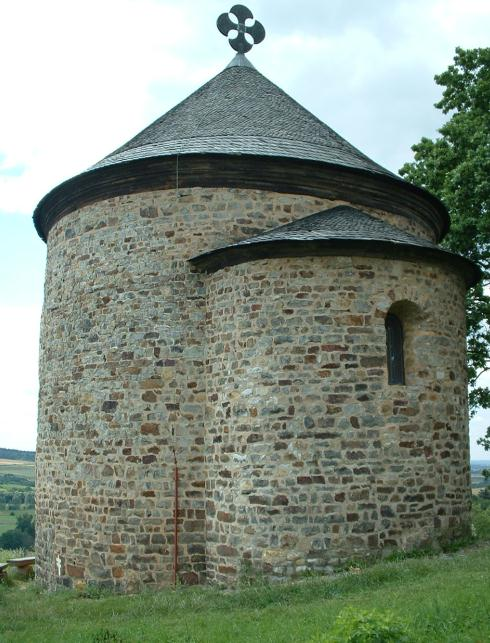
Rotunda in Starý Plzenec, Czech Republic from the 10th century

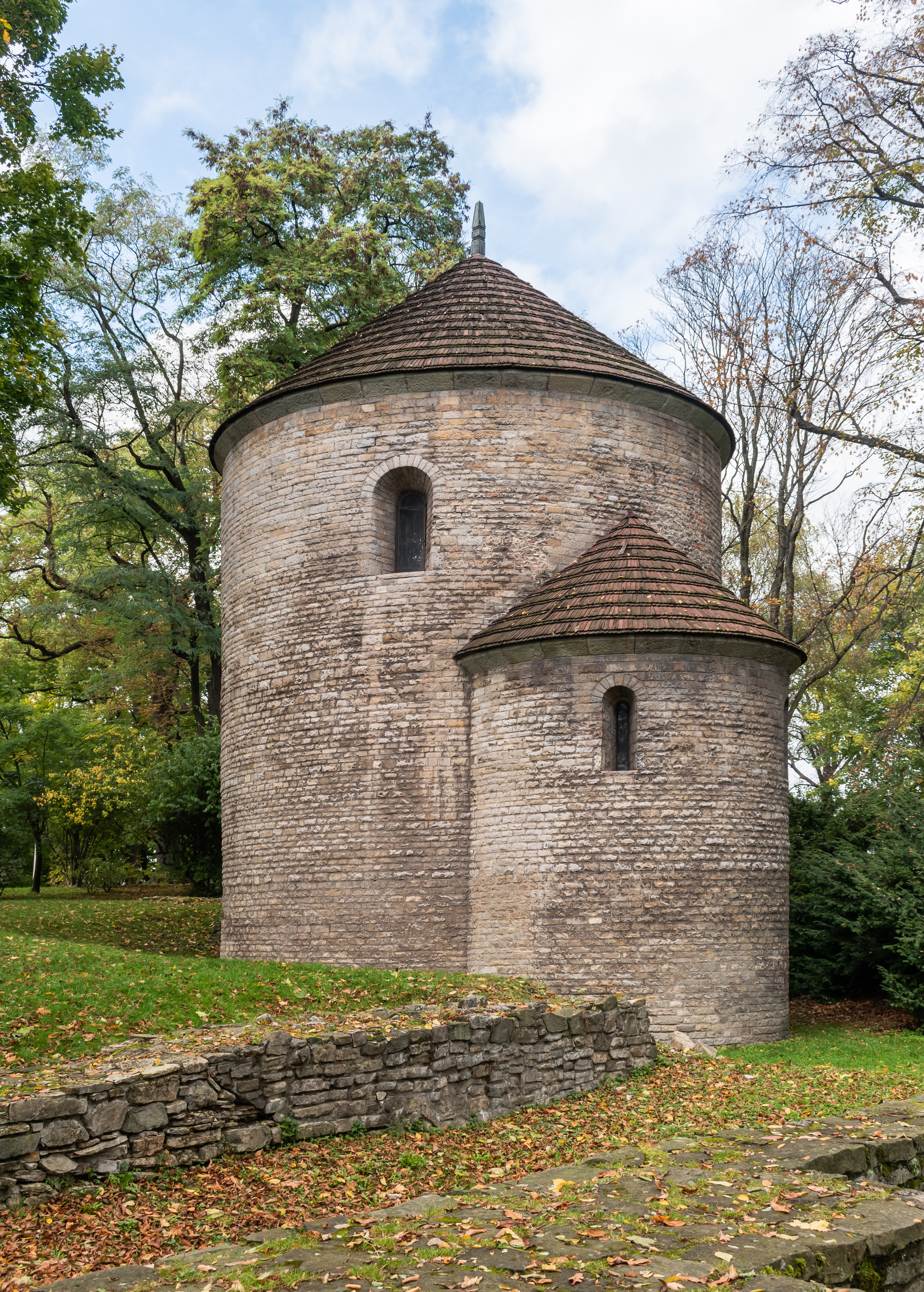
St. Nicholas Rotunda in Cieszyn, Poland, 12th century

=== Carpathian Basin ===
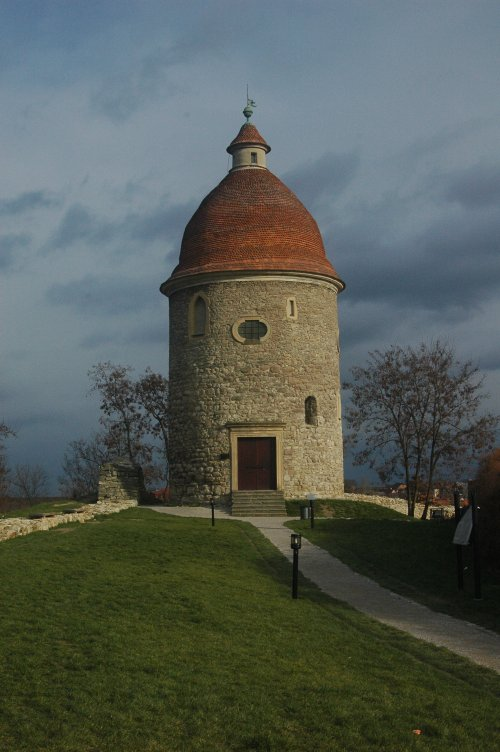
Rotunda of St. George in Skalica, Slovakia from 11th century

Several types of rotundas are found in the Carpathian Basin, within the former boundaries of Kingdom of Hungary. Building of rotundas in Carpathian basin started already in 9th century in Great Moravia. According to the research and radiocarbon dating of plaster, Rotunda of st. George in Nitrianska Blatnica was built sometimes around the year 830, what makes it one of the oldest still standing buildings in the area of Central Europe (however the result calculation methodology has been recently questioned by other researchers). Similar rotunda was standing in hillfort Kostolec in Ducové (only foundations remained). The role and form of rotundas developed from gradual enlargements of ancient small village churches. Many of them still stand today, e.g. in Nagytótlak, Kallósd and Kissikátor in Hungary or in Bíňa and Šivetice in Slovakia. Rotunda in Šivetice is the biggest one in Central Europe, with diameter of 11 m. In many places the ancient foundations have been excavated and conserved. The village church of Sárospatak is complete with a simple circular nave and an eastern apse. The church of Alagimajor at Dunakeszi was enlarged toward the apse in the 14th century. More significant enlargement of the central rotunda is seen at Isaszeg where the extension extended toward the East and West; the rotunda foundations can also be seen in the central portion of the nave of the Gothic church. In many cases the rotunda was used as the apse of the village's new and larger church (Bagod-Szentpál, Hidegség, Vágkeresztur, Ipolykiskeszi, Herencsény, Szalonna). Such semi-circle apses are preserved all over the Carpathian Basin. Rotundas of six apses, a most interesting form, are found at Karcsa, Kiszombor in Hungary, at Horjany in Ukraine and several places in Armenia (Aragatz, Bagaran, Bagnayr, Botshor, Kiagmis Alti).

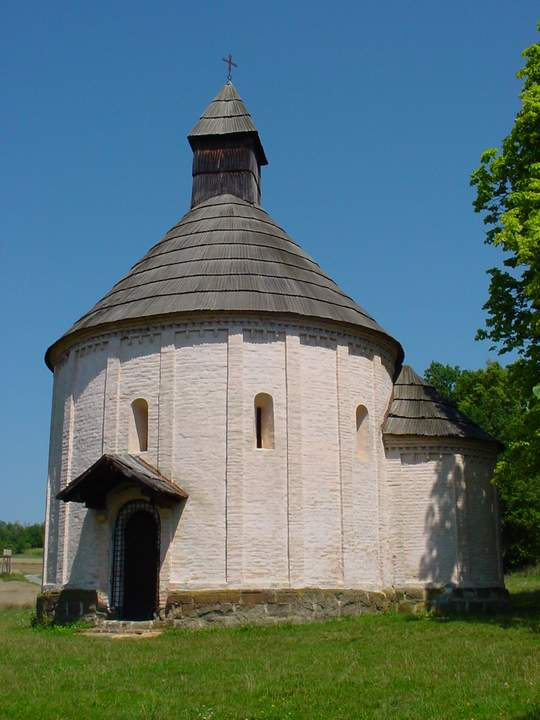
Romanesque village church in Selo, Slovenia

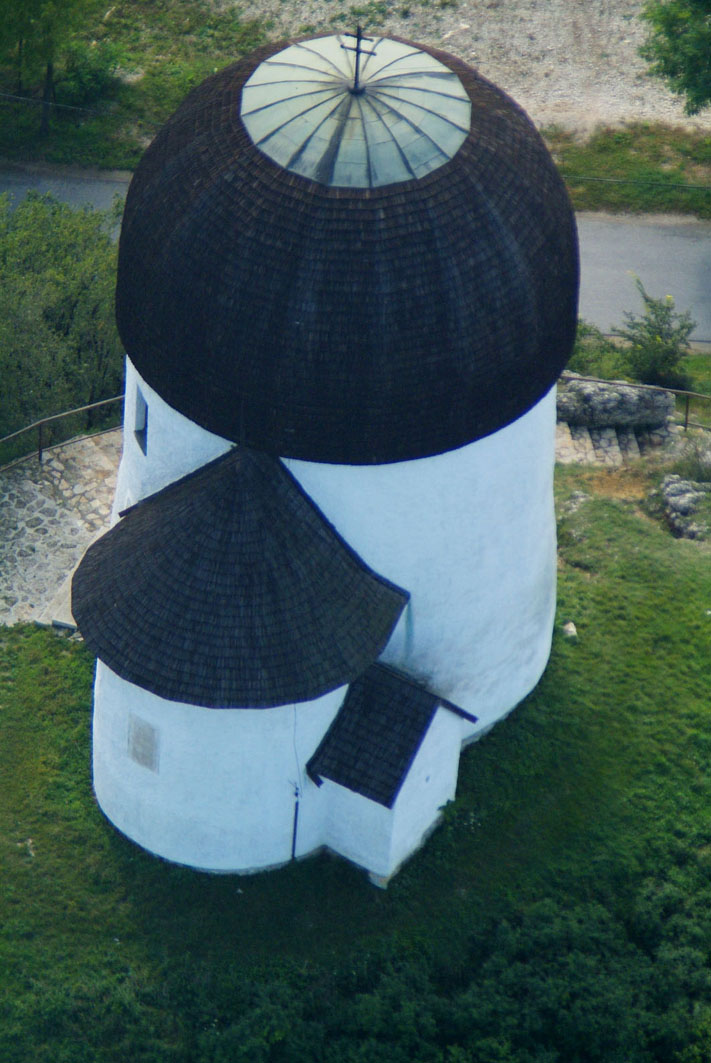
Rotunda, Öskü, Hungary

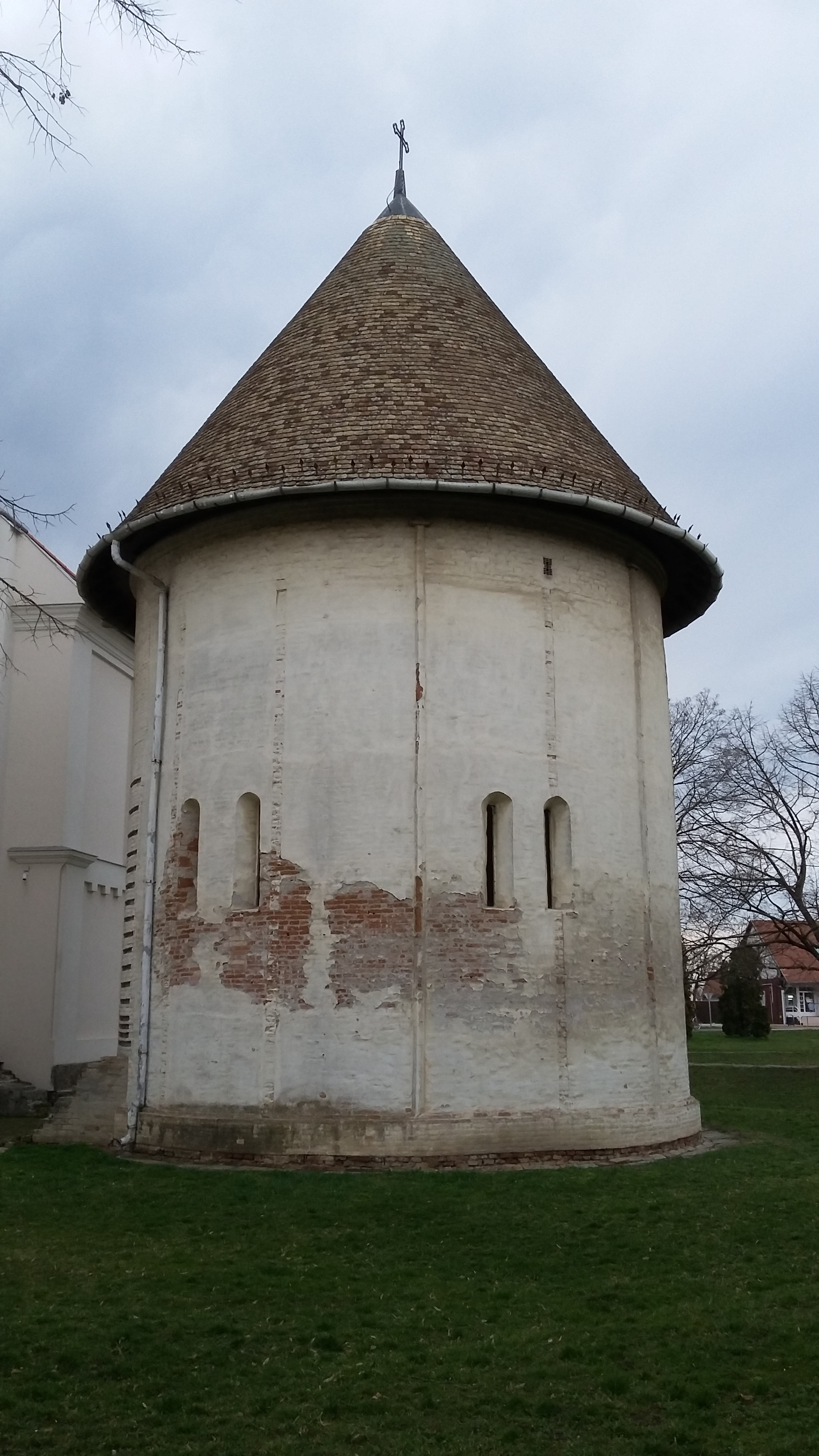
Rotunda, Kiszombor, Hungary

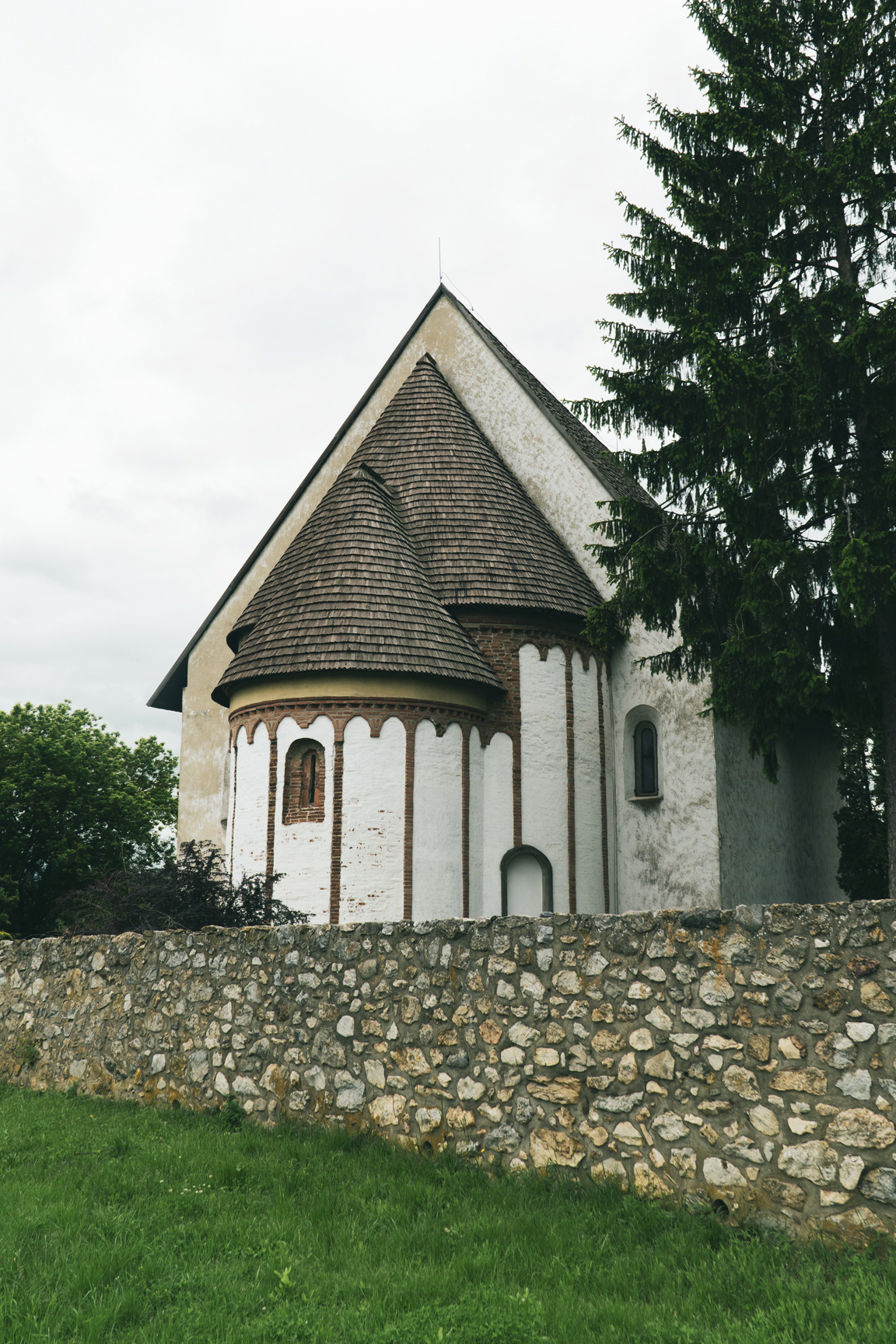
Rotunda rebuilt into bigger church in Szalonna, Hungary

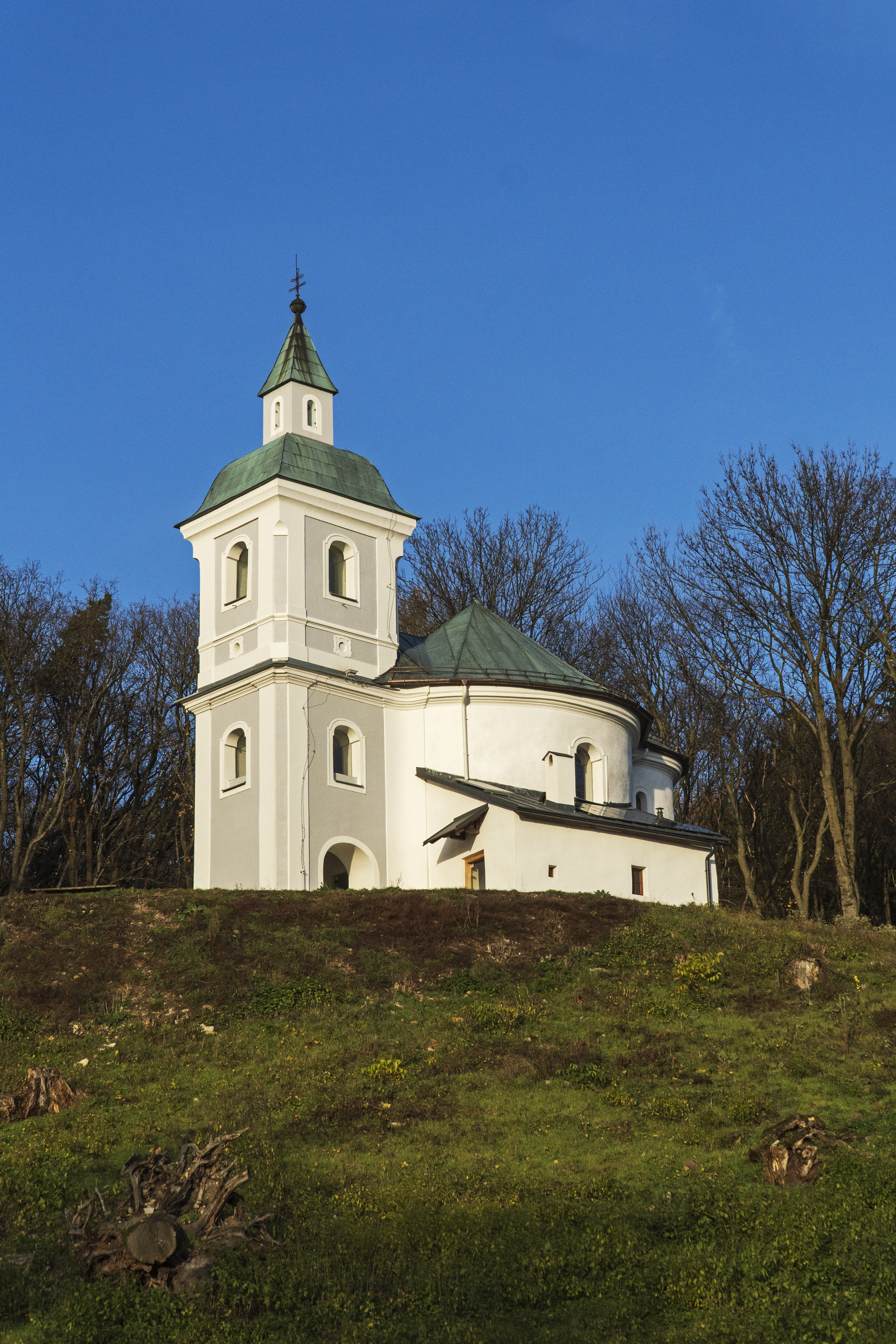
Great Moravian rotunda of St. George. Nitrianska Blatnica, Slovakia

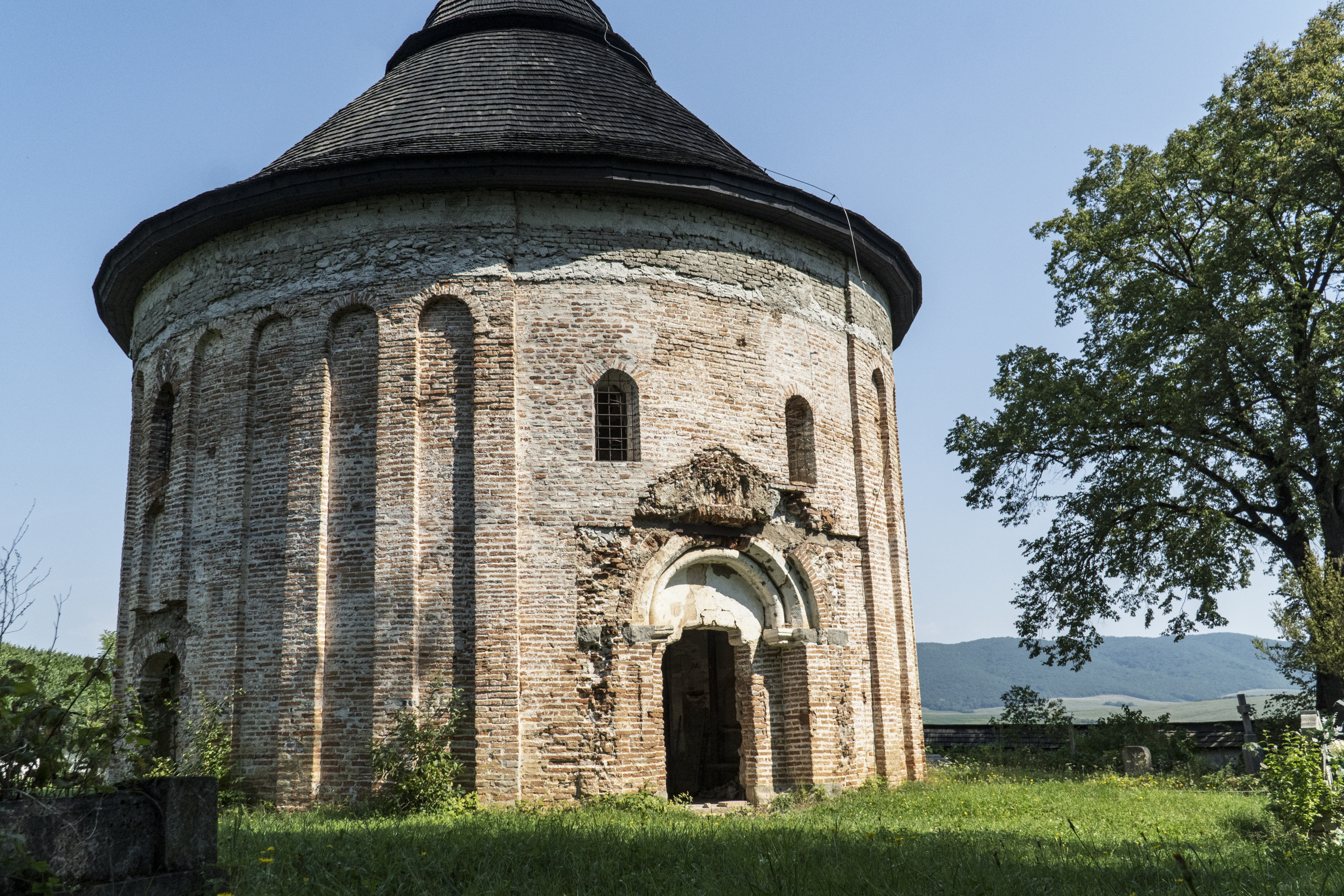
Rotunda of St. Margaret the Virgin in Šivetice, Slovakia; the biggest rotunda in Central Europe

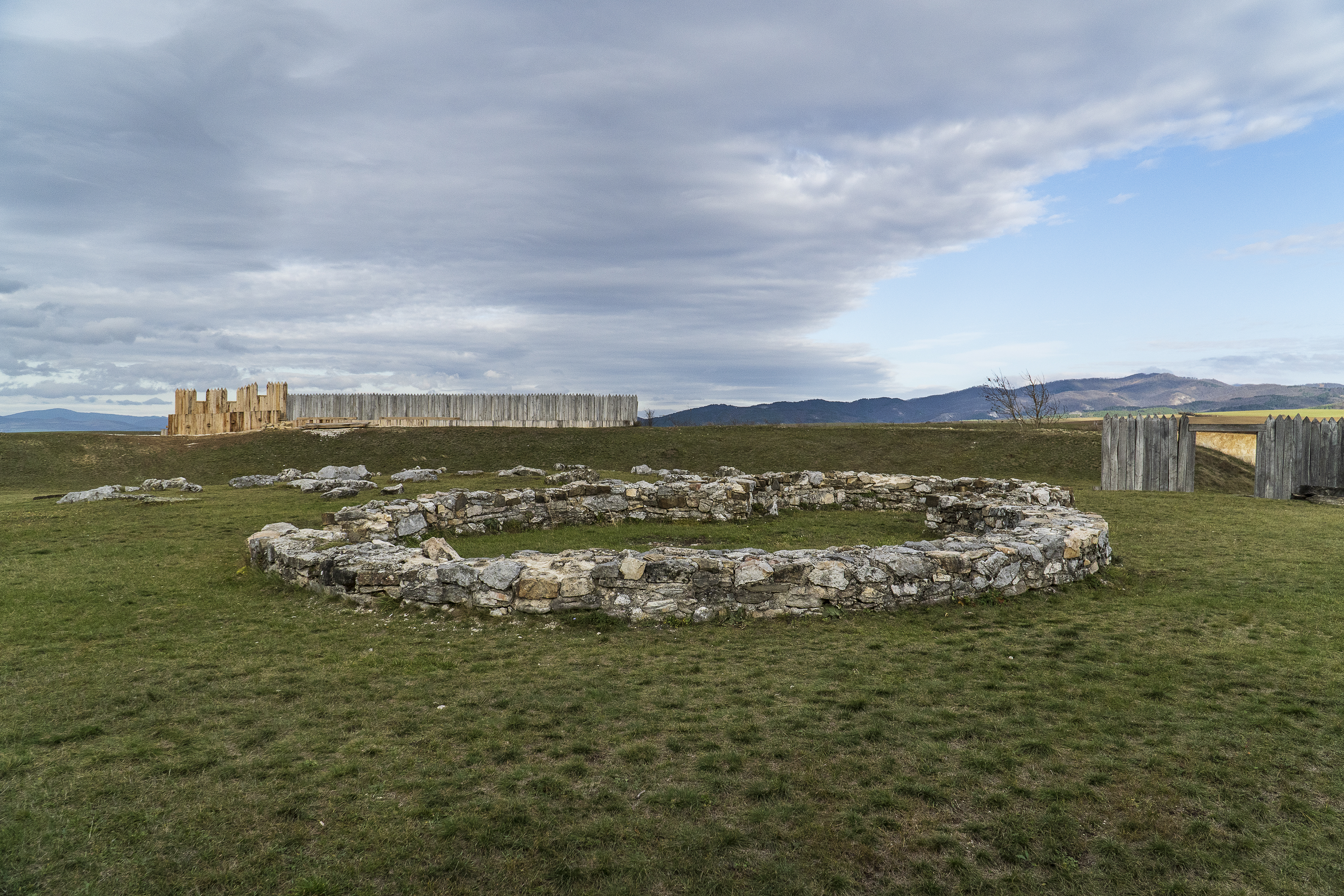
Foundations of Great Moravian rotunda in Kostolec gord in Ducové, Slovakia

== Caucasus ==
There is an interesting connection between Central European and Caucasian rotundas of the 9th to 11th centuries AD. Several Armenian built rotunda churches have sixfold arched central apsis, i.e. at Aragatz, Bagaran, Bagnayr, Botshor, Kiagmis Alti in Armenia. At the same time eightfold arched central buildings (rotunda) are also frequently occurring in Armenia: Ani, Irind, Varzhahan. It was a suggestion (Csemegi J.) that there was not only western European but Eastern Caucasian relation for architects of Hungary in this age of King Stephen I of Hungary.

Good example of Georgian rotunda church is Bana cathedral which is now located on territory of Turkey.

== East Asia ==
- Temple of Heaven construction completed on 1420 during Yongle Emperor who also constructed Forbidden City of China
- Fujian Tulou is a traditional rural dwellings of the Hakka in Fujian region of China. They are built between the 12th and the 20th centuries.
Hall of Prayer for Good Harvests, the largest building in the Temple of Heaven

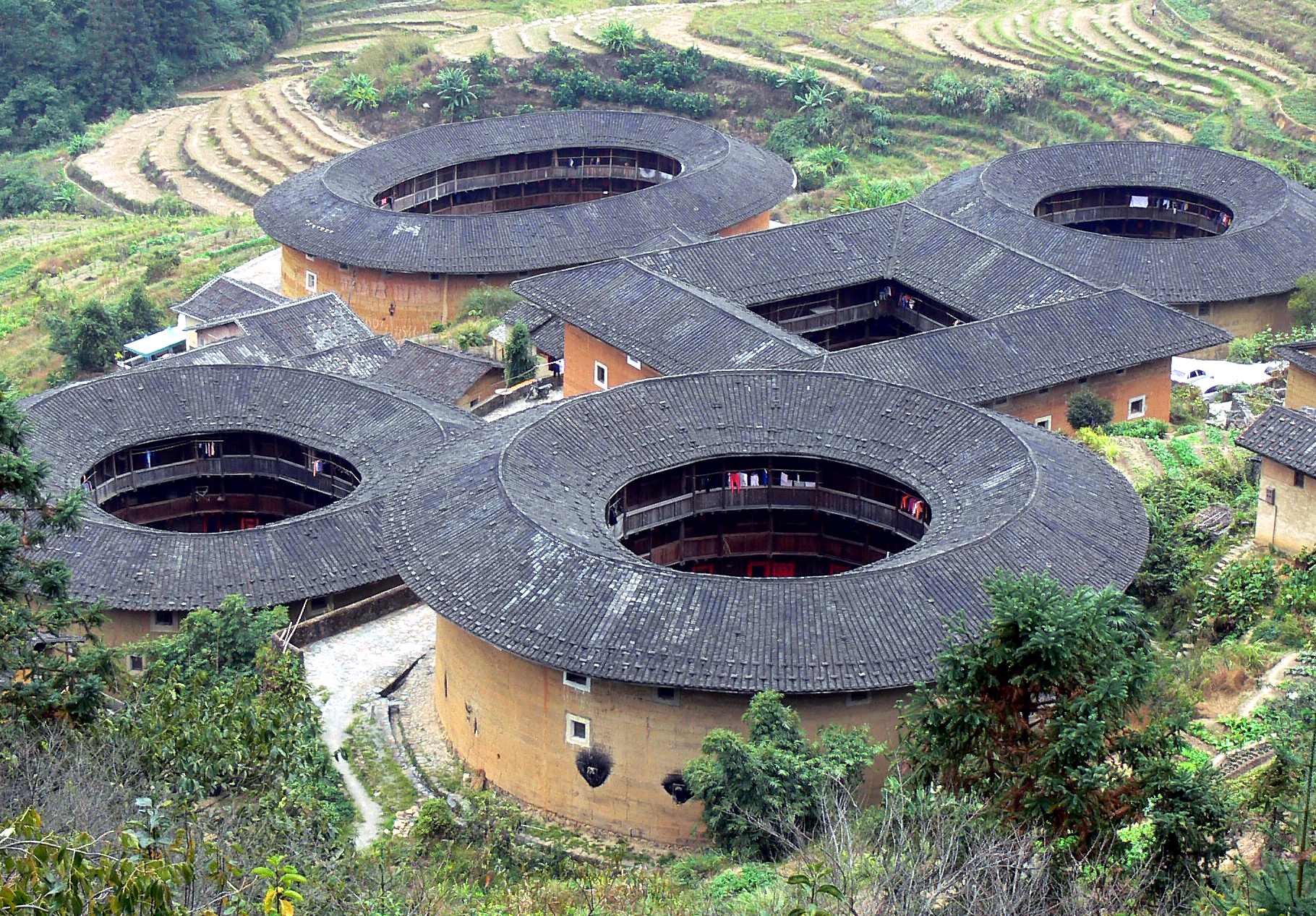
Tianluokeng tulou cluster

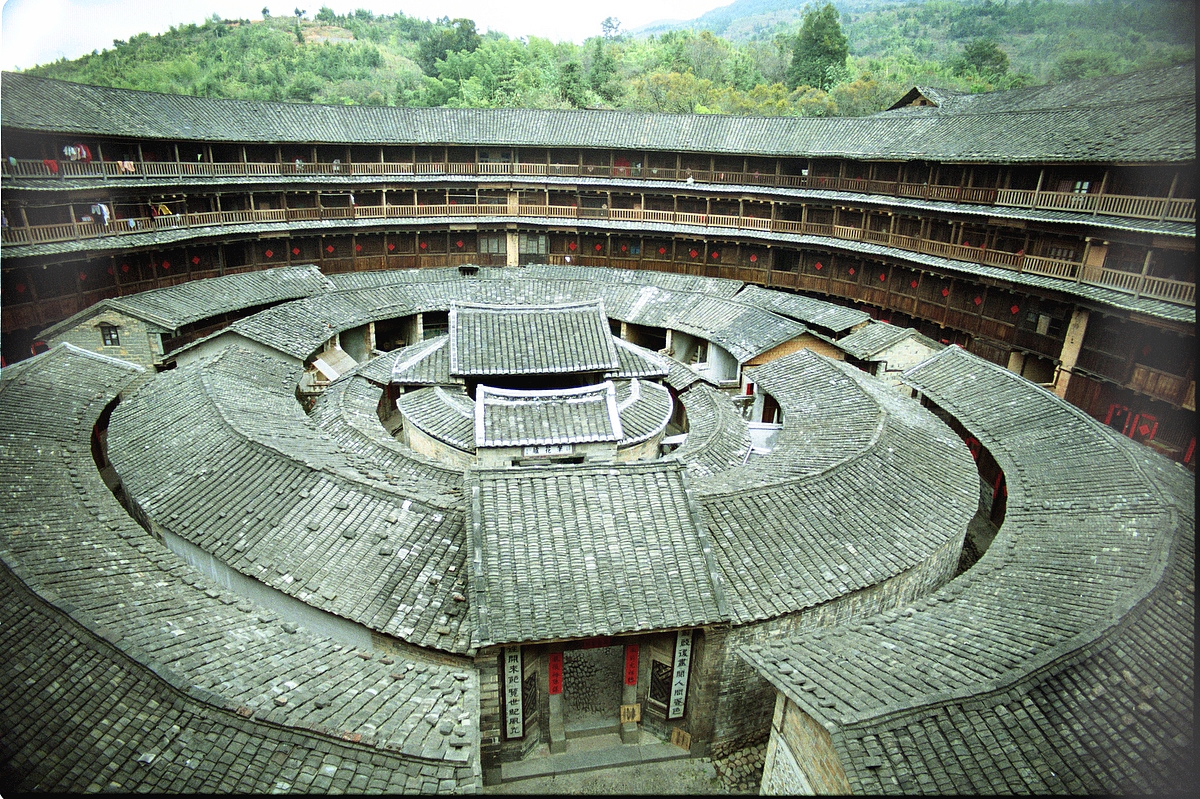
4 concentric ring architecture of Chengqi lou

== Notable rotundas ==
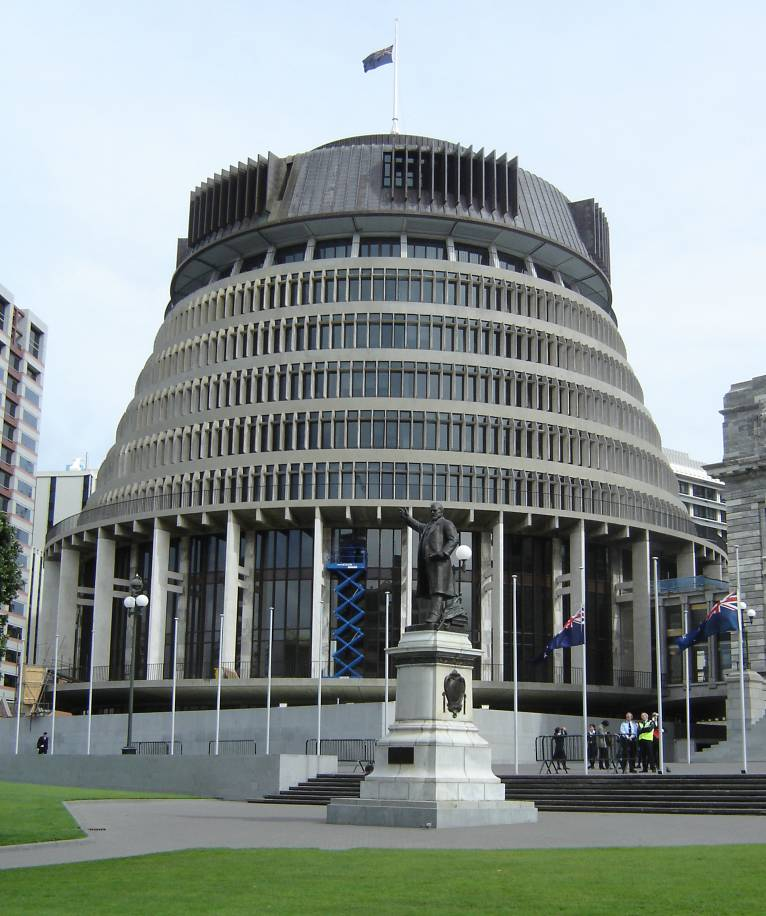
Beehive, Wellington, New Zealand

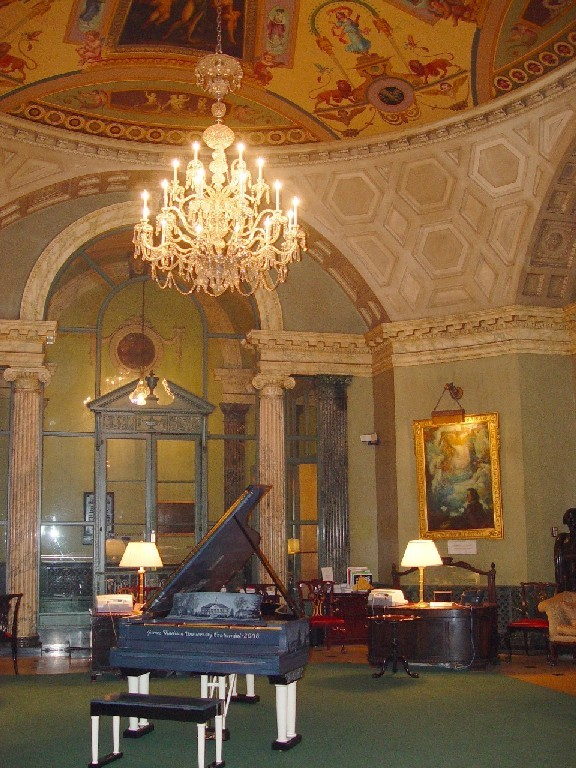
Interior of the rotunda at New York City's Steinway Hall with an Art Case Piano by artist Mia LaBerge in the foreground

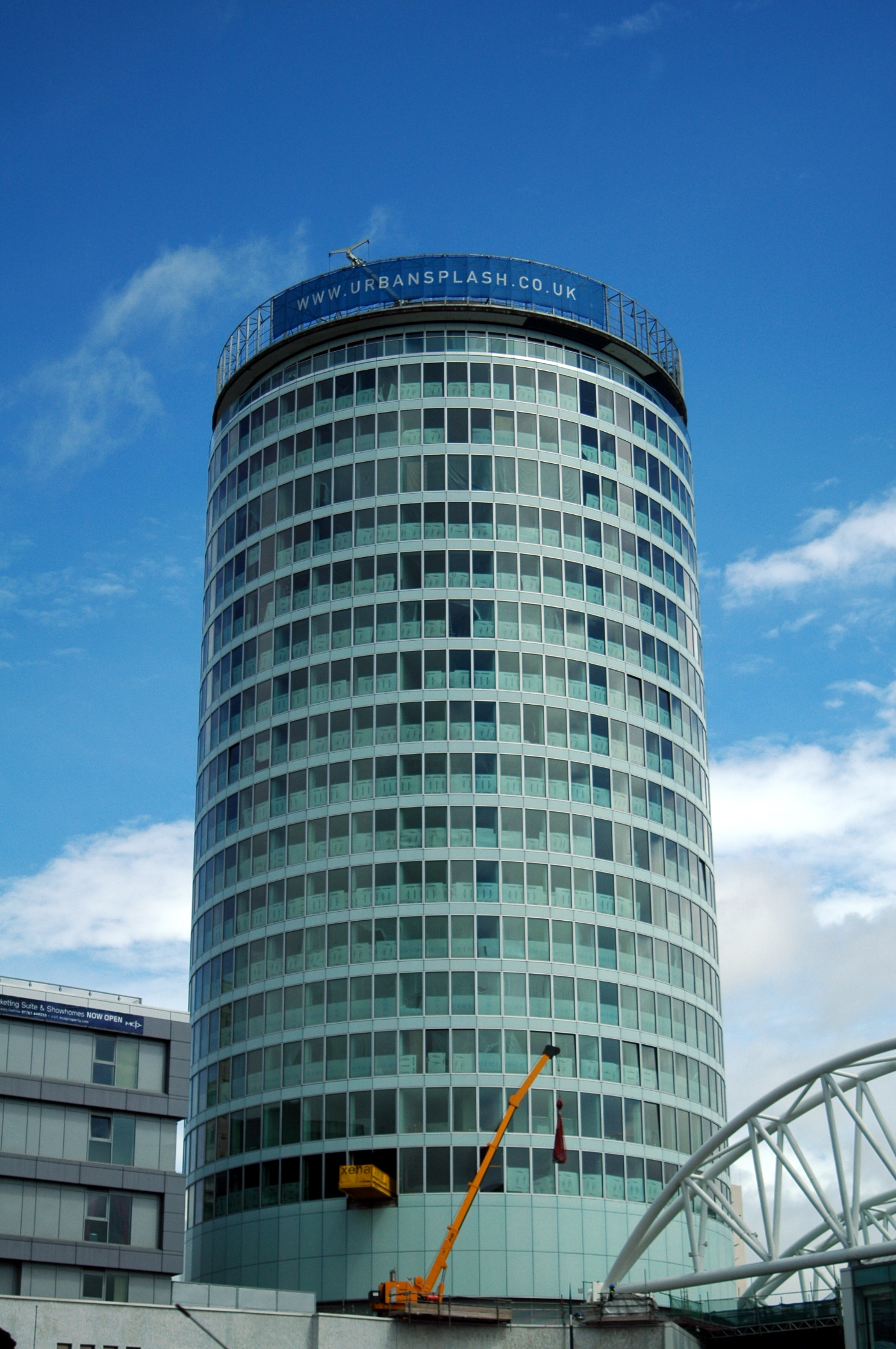
The Rotunda in Birmingham, England is an example of a modern rotunda building

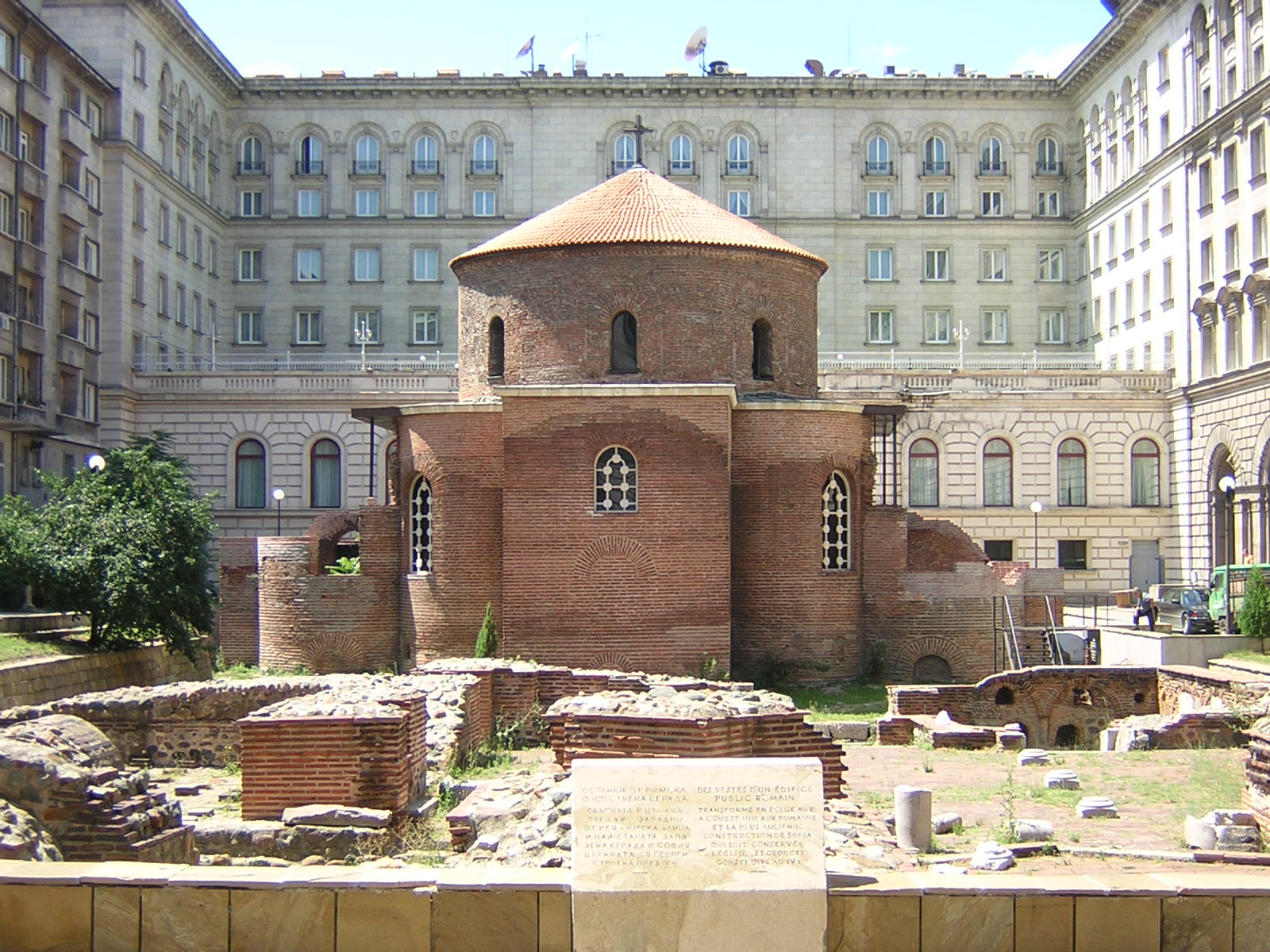
The St. George Rotunda (4th century) and some remains of Serdica can be seen in the foreground.

=== Religious ===
- Baptistery at the Piazza dei Miracoli, Pisa, Italy
- Pantheon, Rome, Italy, originally built as a temple to the seven deities of the seven planets in the state religion of Ancient Rome; now used as a basilica informally named Santa Maria della Rotonda
- Santo Stefano Rotondo, Rome
- The Church of the Rotonda in Thessaloniki, built as the "Tomb of Galerius" in 306 AD
- St George Rotunda in Sofia, Bulgaria, a 4th-century Early Christian church
- St. George Cathedral Church at Zvartnots, Armenia
- St. Martin's Rotunda in Vyšehrad Castle, Prague, Czech Republic
- Rotunda of Saint Catherine in Znojmo, Czech Republic
- St. Alexander's Church in Warsaw, Poland
- Rotunda of St Marija Assunta in Mosta, Malta
- Temple Church in London
- Chausathi Yogini temples at Hirapur, Jabalpur and Morena in India
- Bahá'í House of Worship in Willmette, Illinois, US
- The Rotunda in Aldershot in the UK, built in 1876 and demolished in the 1980s

=== Monuments ===
- Qabus Tower, in Gonbad-e Kavus, Iran. Built in 1006 AD. It is the burial place of Qabus, an emir of Ziyarid dynasty. at 61 meters, it is one of the highest historical buildings of its kind.
- Resket Tower, in Resket-e Olya, Iran. Probably built in 1021, it is the grave of an emir of Bavand dynasty. it is 20 kilometres away from the similar Lajim Tower.
- Lajim Tower, in Lajim, Iran. built in 1022 AD, it is the grave of an emir of Bavand dynasty.
- Toghrol Tower, in Ray, Iran. Many consider it to be the burial place of Tughril I, founder of Seljuk Empire, who died in 1063 AD.
- Aladdin Tower, in Varamin, Iran. Built in 1298 AD, it is the grave of a local governor of Ilkhanate.
- Dome of Soltaniyeh, in Soltaniyeh, Iran. Built in 1312 AD, it is the maosuleum of Öljaitü, Mongol ruler of Ilkhanate. it is still one of the biggest unreinforced domes in the world.

=== Entertainment ===
- Ranelagh Gardens in London, built in the 1740s and demolished in 1805. It was painted by Canaletto.
- Takyeh Dowlat, in Tehran, built in 1868, demolished in 1947. it was located in Golestan Palace and was used for religious ceremonies.
- Pantheon, London, opened 1772, demolished in 1937.
- The leisure centre at Fort Regent, in St Helier, Jersey, a regular venue for shows, concerts and events
- The internal Rotunda in the Michael Maddox Petrovsky Theatre, Moscow (burnt down in 1805).
- Gate Theatre in Dublin, Ireland (formerly part of the Rotunda Hospital, built in 1757).
- Roundhouse in London, originally built in 1847 as a turntable engine shed, it was used as a gin store till being converted into a theatre in the 1960s.
- Royal Albert Hall in London, England.
- IMAX Theatre in London, England.
- The Jackie Robinson Rotunda at Citi Field.
- Romanian Athenaeum in Bucharest. It is a concert hall and a landmark of the Romanian capital city. Opened in 1888, the ornate, domed, circular building is the city's main concert hall and home of the "George Enescu" Philharmonic and of the George Enescu annual international music festival.
- Ohio Stadium in Columbus, Ohio, built in 1922
- Riding Mountain (roller coaster), 18th-century entertainment pavilion in Tsarskoe Selo, Russia, architected by Francesco Bartolomeo Rastrelli had a rotunda interior

=== Residential ===
- Villa Capra "La Rotonda" by the Italian Renaissance architect Andrea Palladio in Vicenza, Italy.
- Ickworth House in Suffolk, England.
- Mereworth Castle in Kent, England.
- The Rotunda in Birmingham, England, built as an office building in 1964.
- The Rotunda Building, Norfolk, Virginia, rebuilt in 2007.

=== Learning ===
- The Radcliffe Camera, Oxford, completed in 1748.
- The Rotunda at the University of Virginia built in 1826.
- British Museum Reading Room, London, built in 1857.
- The Rotunda Museum, Scarborough, North Yorkshire.
- The Central Library, Manchester.
- Dallas Hall at Southern Methodist University, Dallas, Texas, built in 1911.
- Grawemeyer Hall at the University of Louisville, built in 1926.
- Stockholm Public Library, Stockholm, built in 1928.
- Umeå University, Umeå, built in 1972.
- Cincinnati Museum Center at Union Terminal built in 1933.
- Science Museum of Virginia built in 1919
- Vanderbilt University's Wyatt Center.
- Drew University's Dorothy Young Center for the Arts built in 2002, and opened in 2003.
- The Campus Activity Centre at Thompson Rivers University, Kamloops, British Columbia.
- Ruffner Hall at Longwood University built in 1839, reconstructed in 2004
- University Community Center (University of West Georgia) built in 1962.

=== Government ===
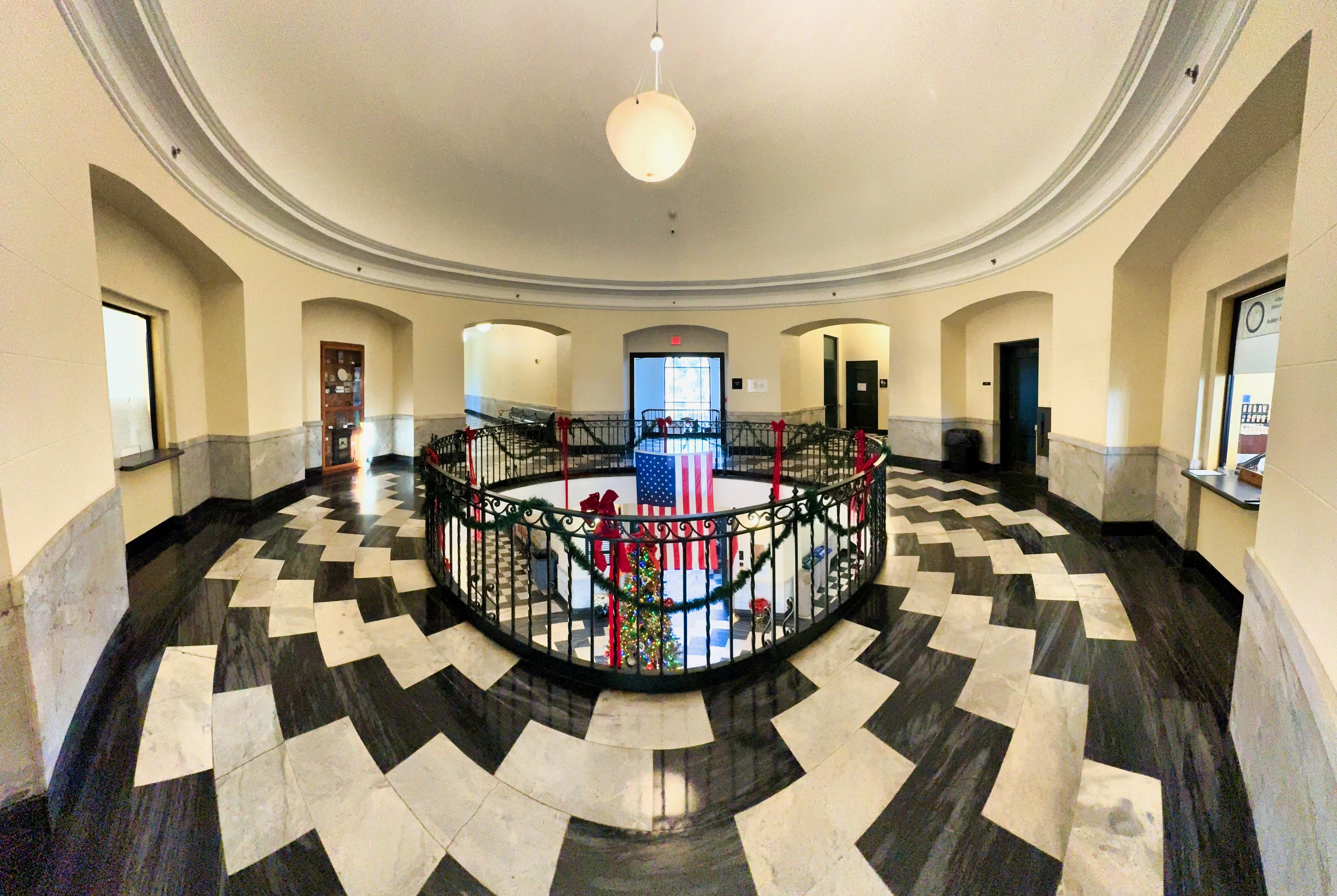
Interior of a rotunda at the Cherokee County Courthouse in North Carolina

- San Francisco City Hall
- The Beehive, the executive wing of the New Zealand Parliament Buildings
- California State Capitol Rotunda in Sacramento, California.
- Library of Parliament, a library for Canadian Parliamentarians. The only component of the Centre Block of Parliament to survive the 1916 fire
- The Rotundas, Marsham Street, a subterranean structure in Marsham Street in London
- The Samsad Bhavan, or the federal Parliament of India, in New Delhi
- San Jose City Hall rotunda in San Jose, California, an all-glass, postmodern structure
- United States Capitol rotunda
- West Virginia State Capitol
- Wisconsin State Capitol Rotunda
- Vermont State Capitol

=== Commercial ===
- Capitol Records Building in Hollywood, Los Angeles, California
- PKO Rotunda, Warsaw, Poland

== See also ==
- Rotunda (disambiguation)
