= Šivetice =

Šivetice Süvete
- Municipality
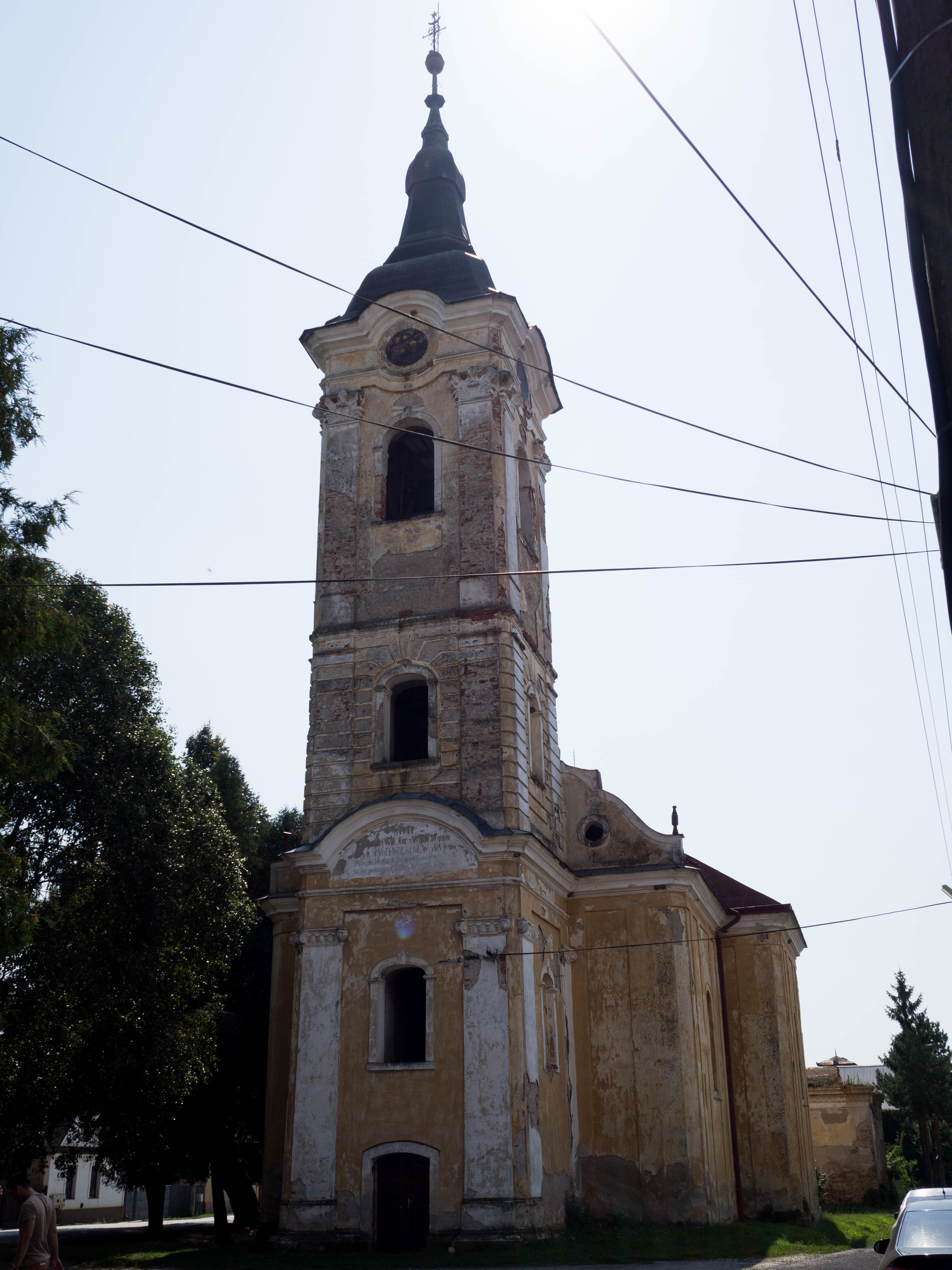

- Flag

- Location of Šivetice in the Banská Bystrica Region Location of Šivetice in Slovakia
- Coordinates: 48.58°N 20.28°E
- Country: Slovakia
- Region: Banská Bystrica Region
- District: Revúca District
- First mentioned: 1262

Area
  - Total: 8.26 km^{2} (3.19 sq mi)
- Elevation: 232 m (761 ft)

Population (2025)
  - Total: 346
- Time zone: UTC+1 (CET)
  - Summer (DST): UTC+2 (CEST)
- Postal code: 491 4
- Area code: +421 58
- Vehicle registration plate (until 2022): RA
- Website: www.sivetice.sk

Šivetice (Hungarian: Süvete) is a village and municipality in Revúca District in the Banská Bystrica Region of Slovakia.

Šivetice used to be knowns for its ceramics.

Monuments of Šivetice include a romanesque rotunda, a classicist lutheran church and the ruins of a small castle.

== Geography ==
The municipality lies at an altitude of 232 metres (761 ft) and covers an area of 8.26 km^{2} (3.19 sq mi) (2025).

== Population ==
Population statistic (10 years)
Year	1995	2005	2015	2025
Count	328	383	383	346
Difference		+16.76%	+0%	−9.66%

Population statistic
Year	2024	2025
Count	348	346
Difference		−0.57%

It has a population of 346 people (31 December 2025).

=== Ethnicity ===
Census 2021 (1+ %)
Ethnicity	Number	Fraction
Slovak	324	90%
Romani	42	11.66%
Hungarian	12	3.33%
Total	360	

In year 2021 was 360 people by ethnicity 324 as Slovak, 42 as Romani, 12 as Hungarian, 3 as Not found out, 1 as Czech, 1 as Romanian and 1 as Other.

Note on population: The difference values of population numbers in the table "Population statistic" and in the sections "Ethnicity" & "Religion" is caused by the use of various statistical methods.

=== Religion ===
Census 2021 (1+ %)
Religion	Number	Fraction
Evangelical Church	132	36.67%
None	124	34.44%
Roman Catholic Church	92	25.56%
Calvinist Church	4	1.11%
Total	360	

In year 2021 was 360 people by religion 132 from Evangelical Church, 124 from None, 92 from Roman Catholic Church, 4 from Calvinist Church, 2 from Not found out, 2 from Greek Catholic Church, 1 from Jewish community, 1 from Jehovah's Witnesses, 1 from Other and 1 from Hinduism.

The vast majority of the local population consists of the local Roma community. In 2019, they constituted an estimated 96% of the local population.

== Rotunda ==
On the hill over village stands romanesque rotunda of St. Margaret of Antioch from the 13th century, built from bricks. It's believed to be the biggest romanesque rotunda in Central Europe, as it have inner diameter 11 metres. Apart from religious function, it was also used as watchtower and refugium, as it is built on a small hill with great view of the valley. It contains unique romanesque and gothic frescoes. Currently It is being reconstructed.

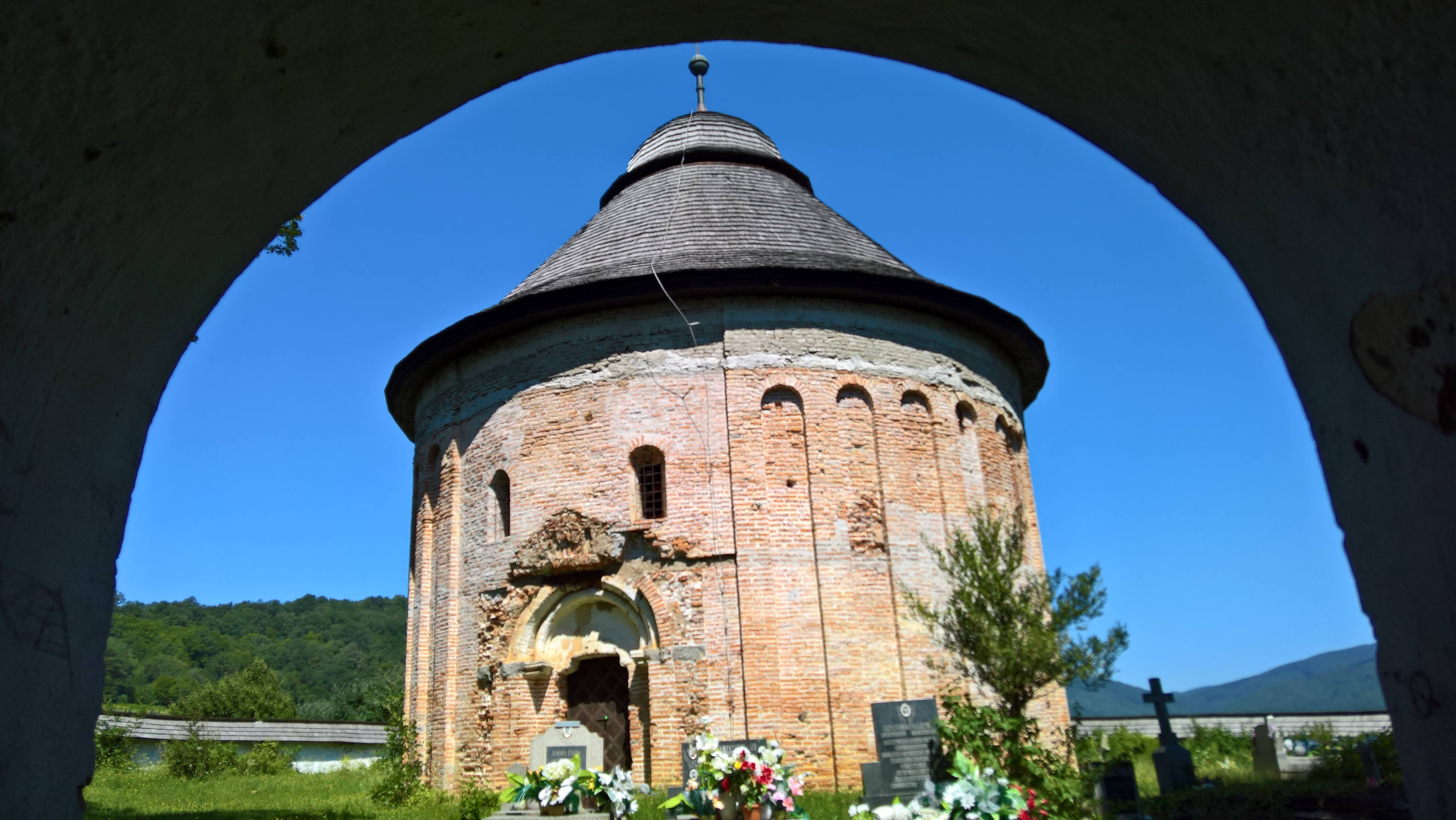
Romanesque rotunda

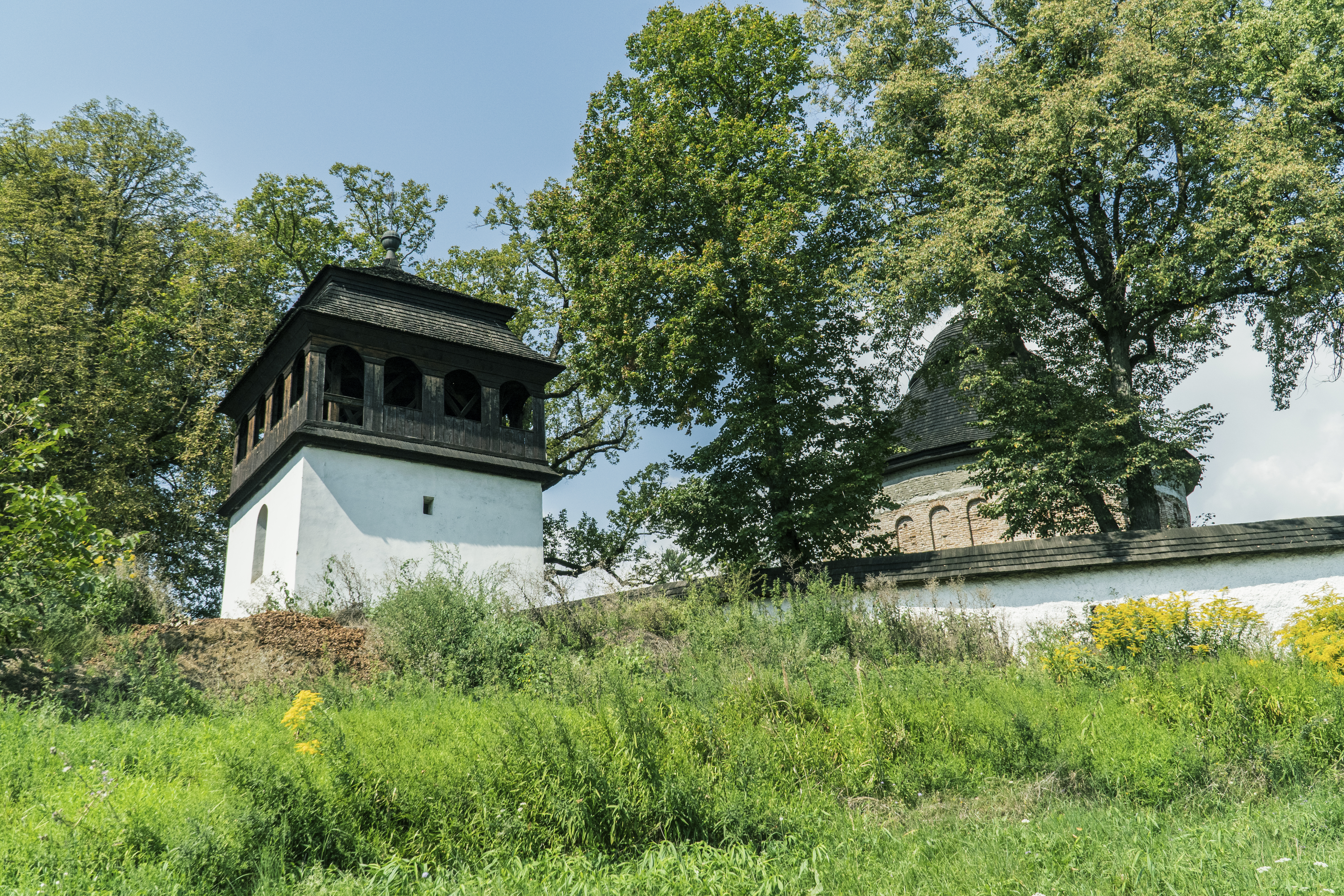
Outer foritication and belltower

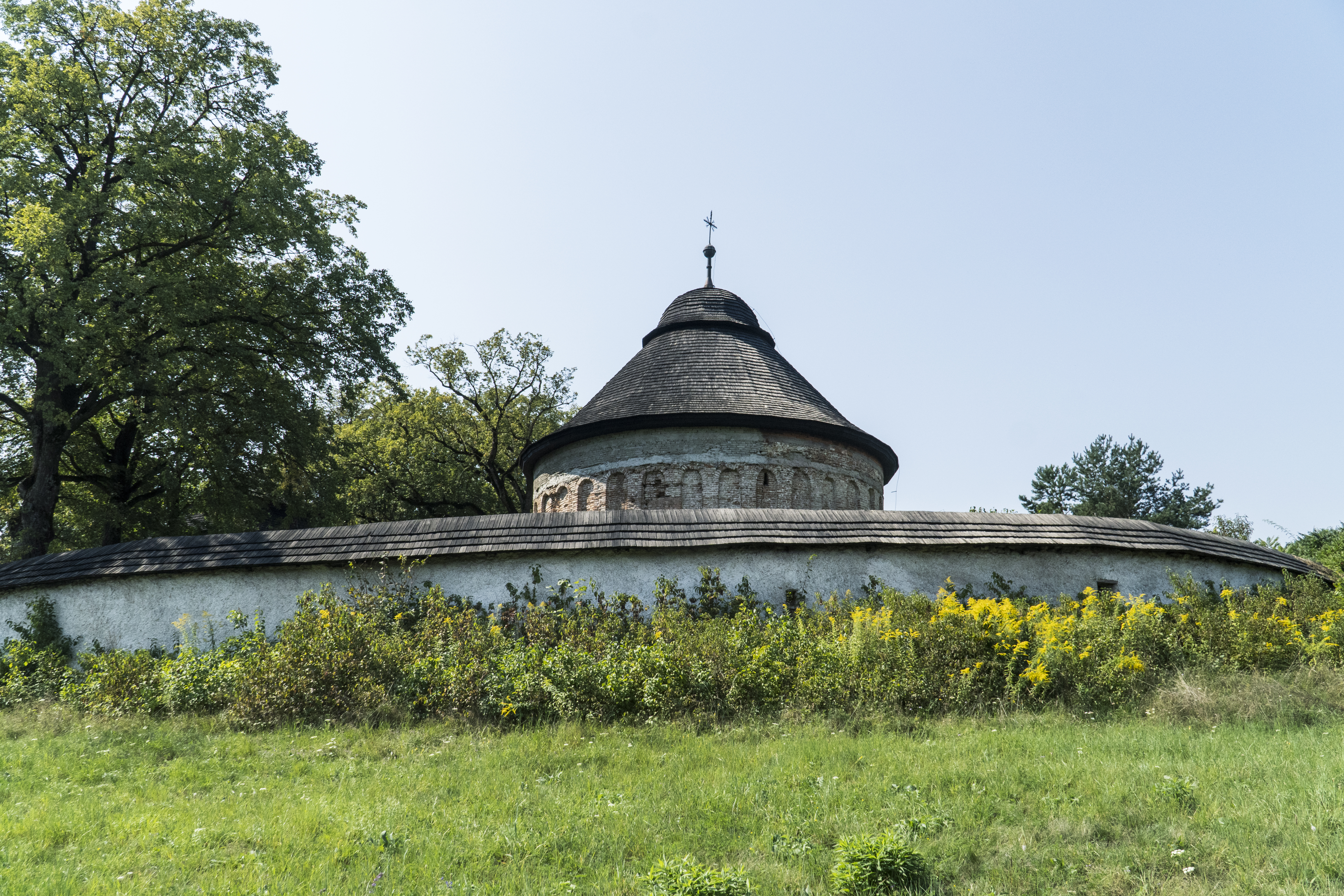
Outer foritication of rotunda.

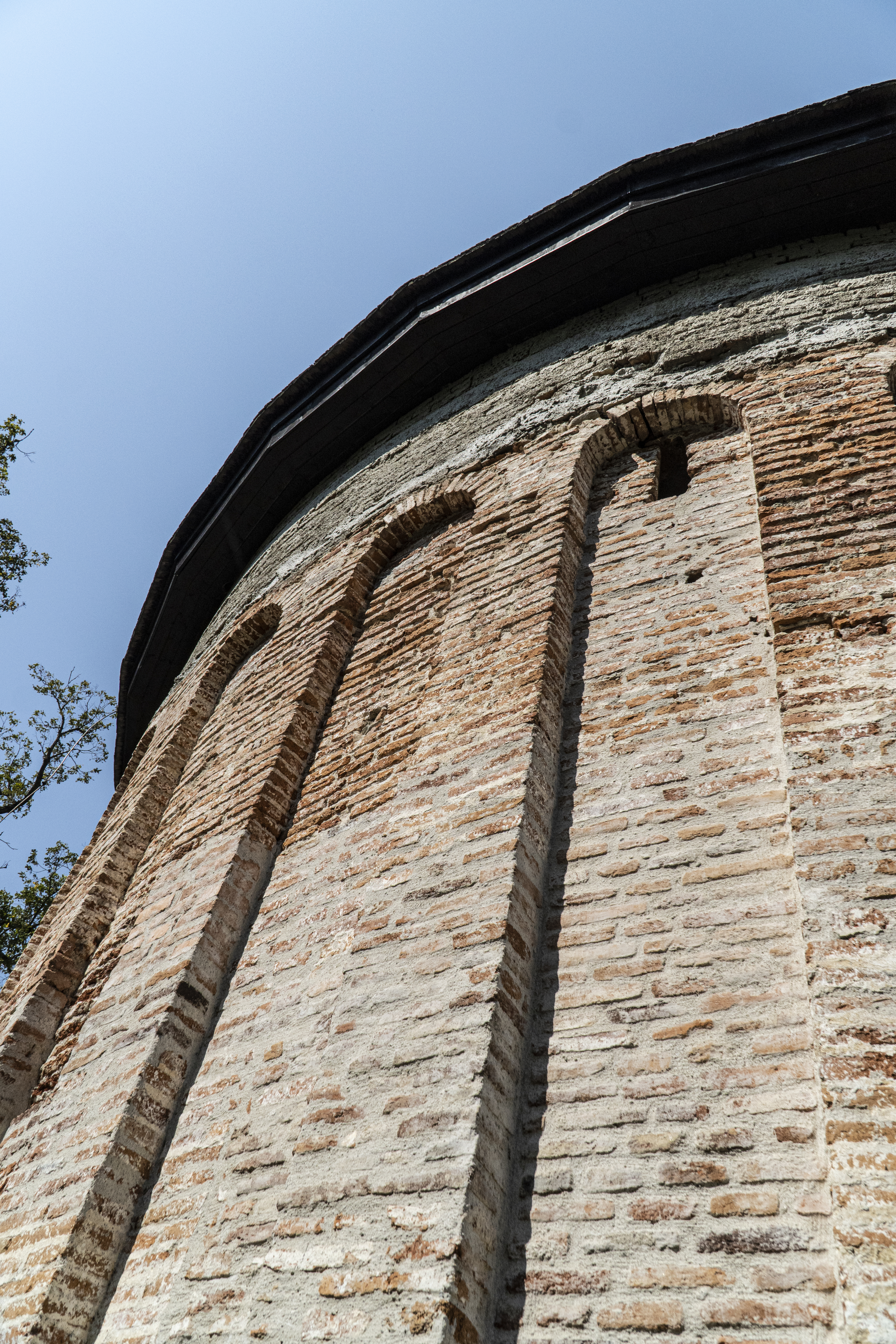
Blind arcades

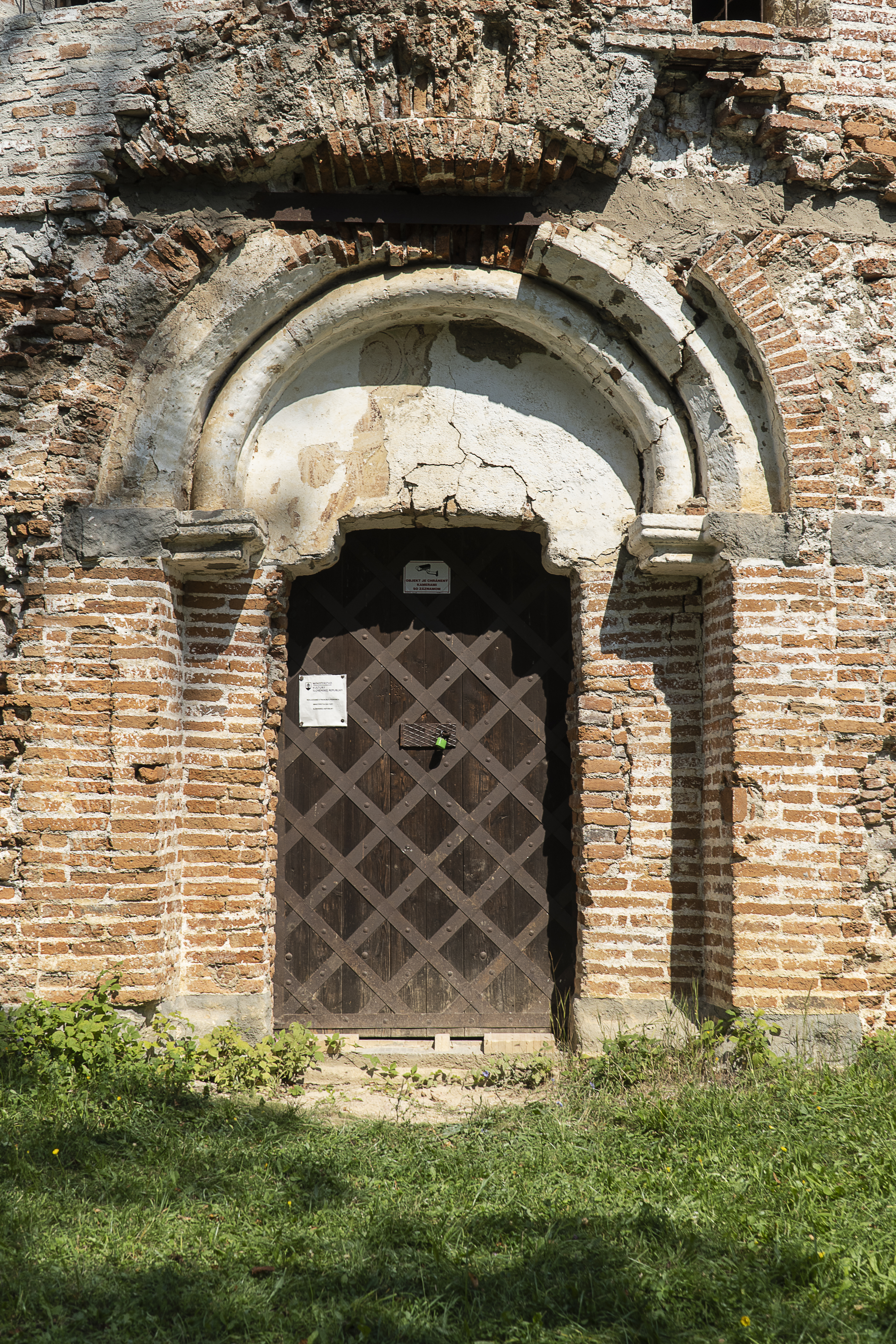
Romanesque portal of rotunda with exterior fresco

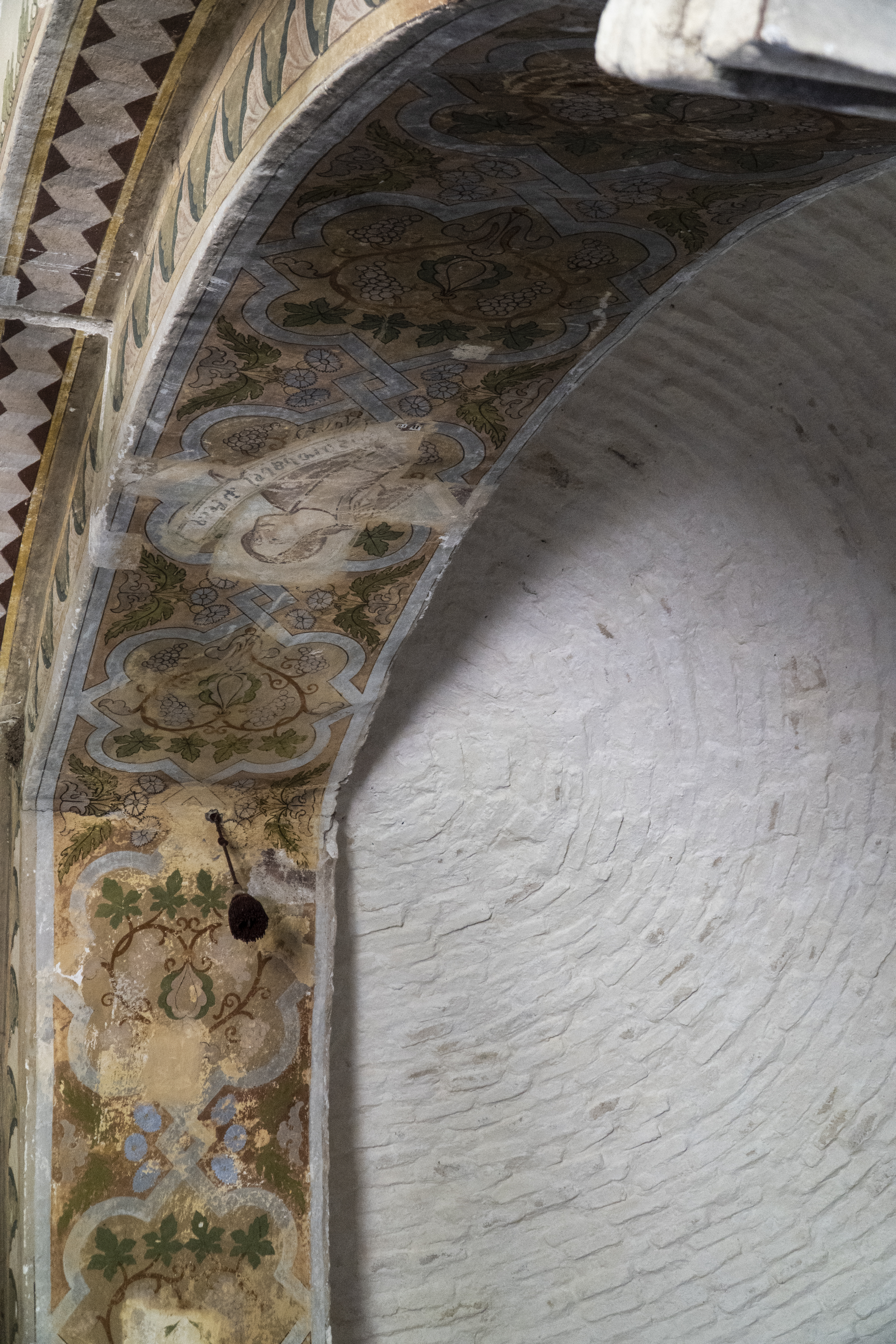
Gothic frescoes

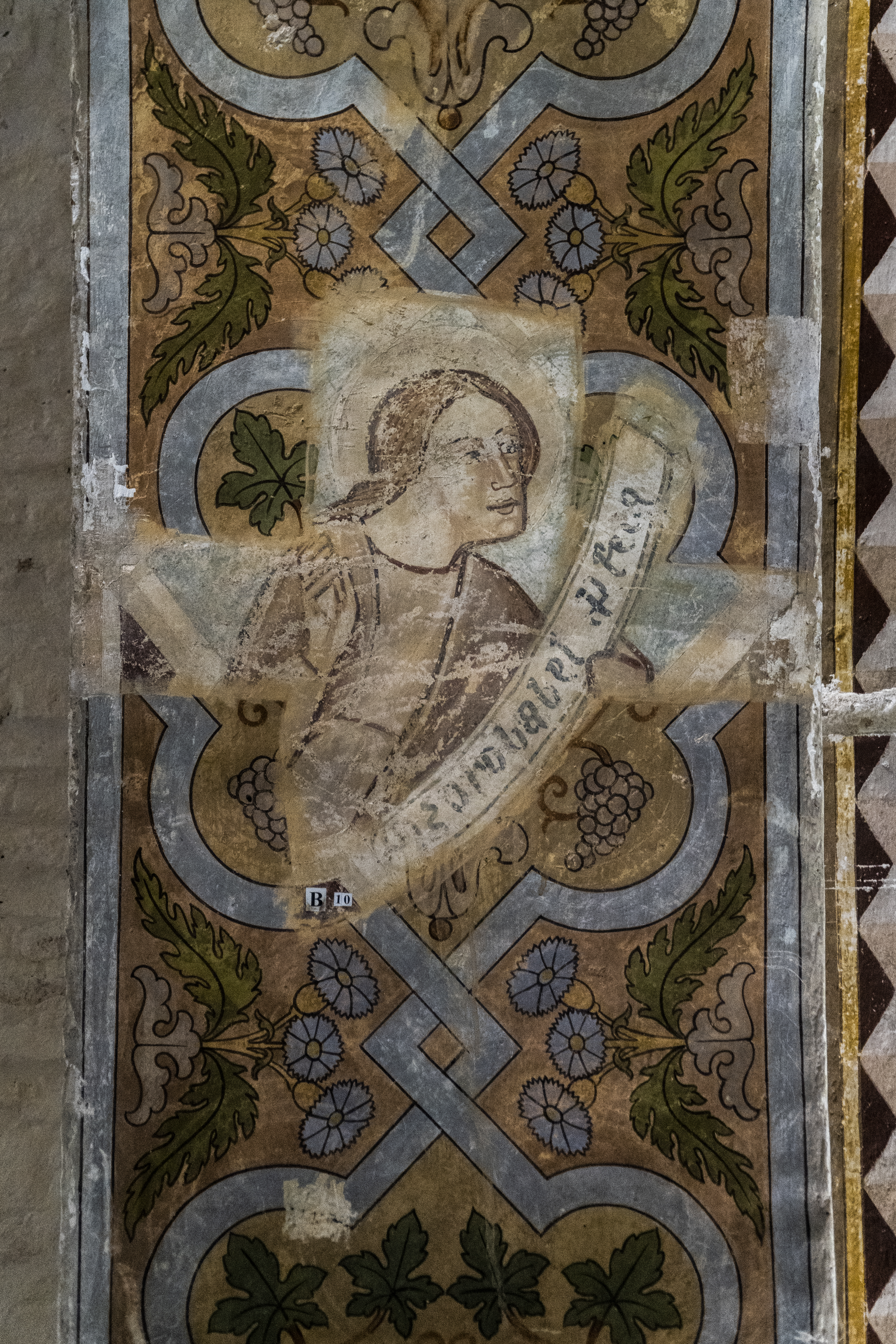
Gothic fresco

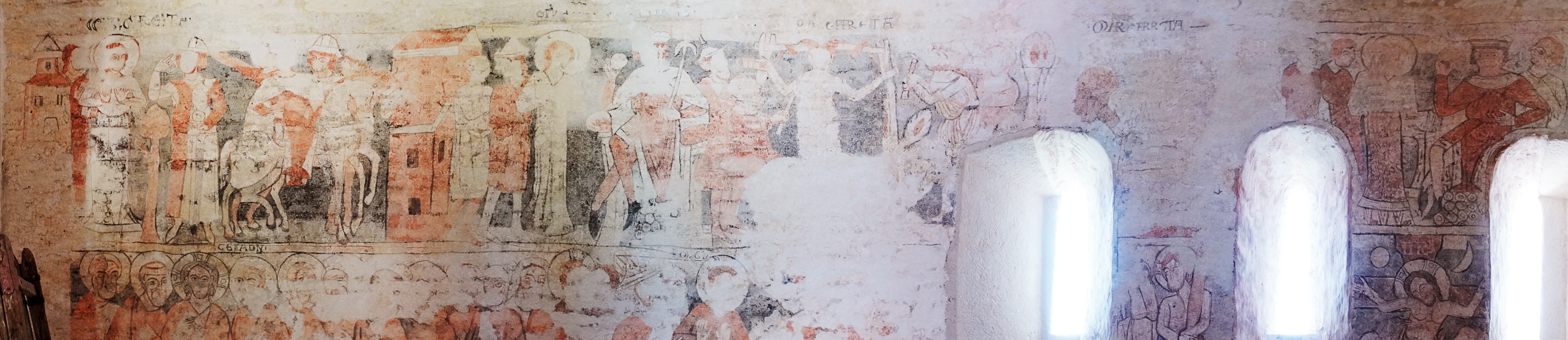
Romanesque frescoes of Legend of St. Margit of Antioch

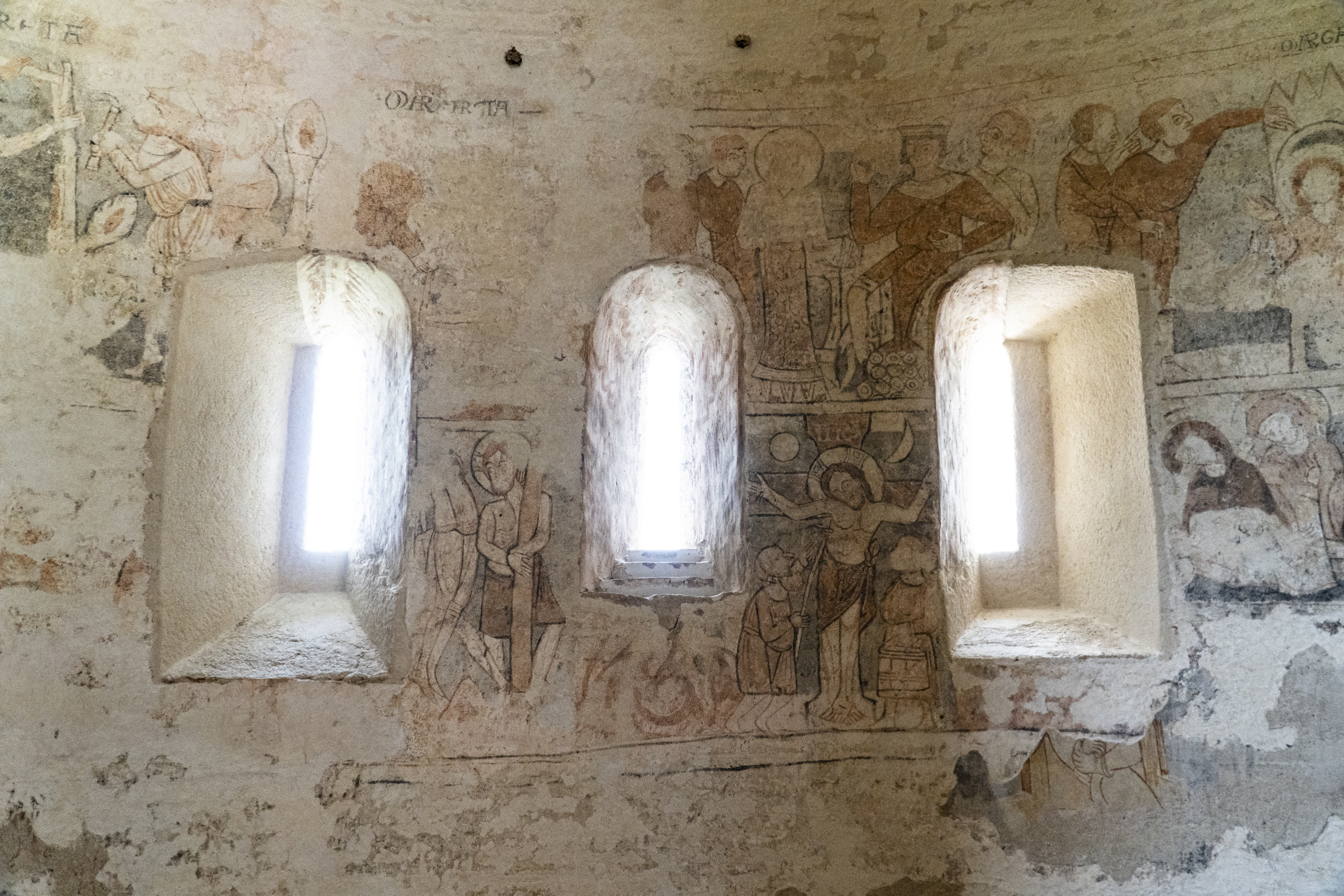
Romanesque frescoes and romanesque windows

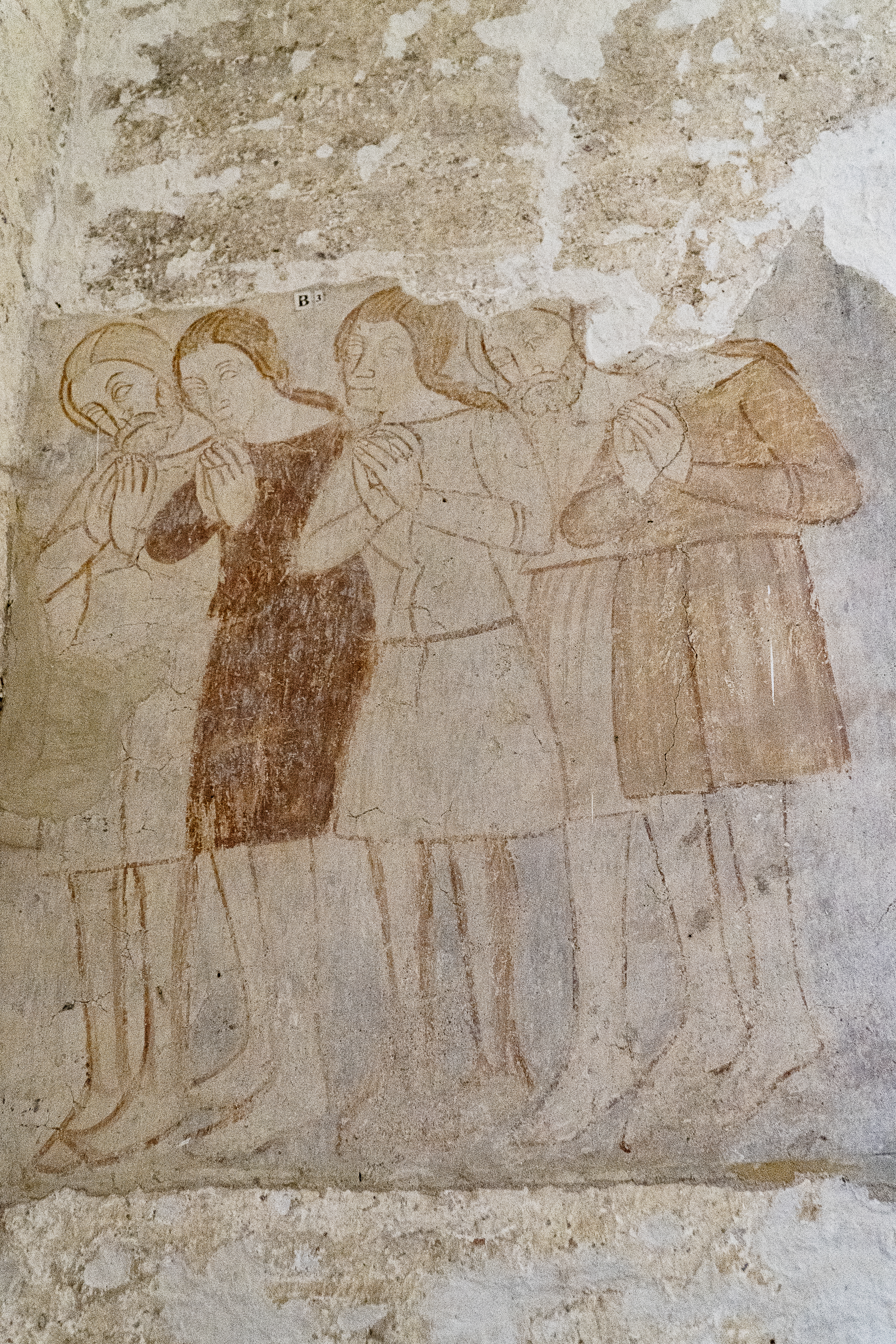
Fresco

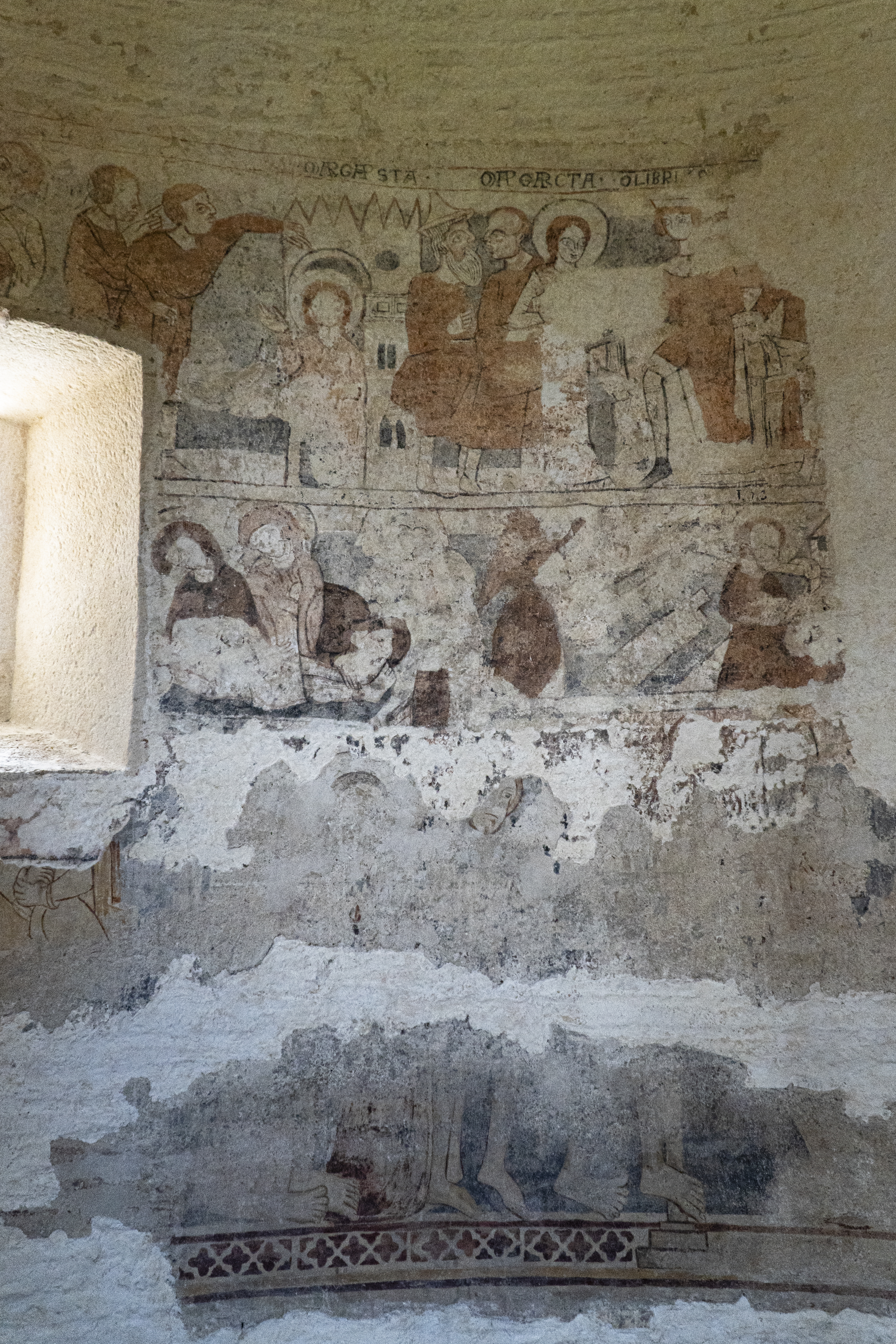
Romanesque and gothic frescoes

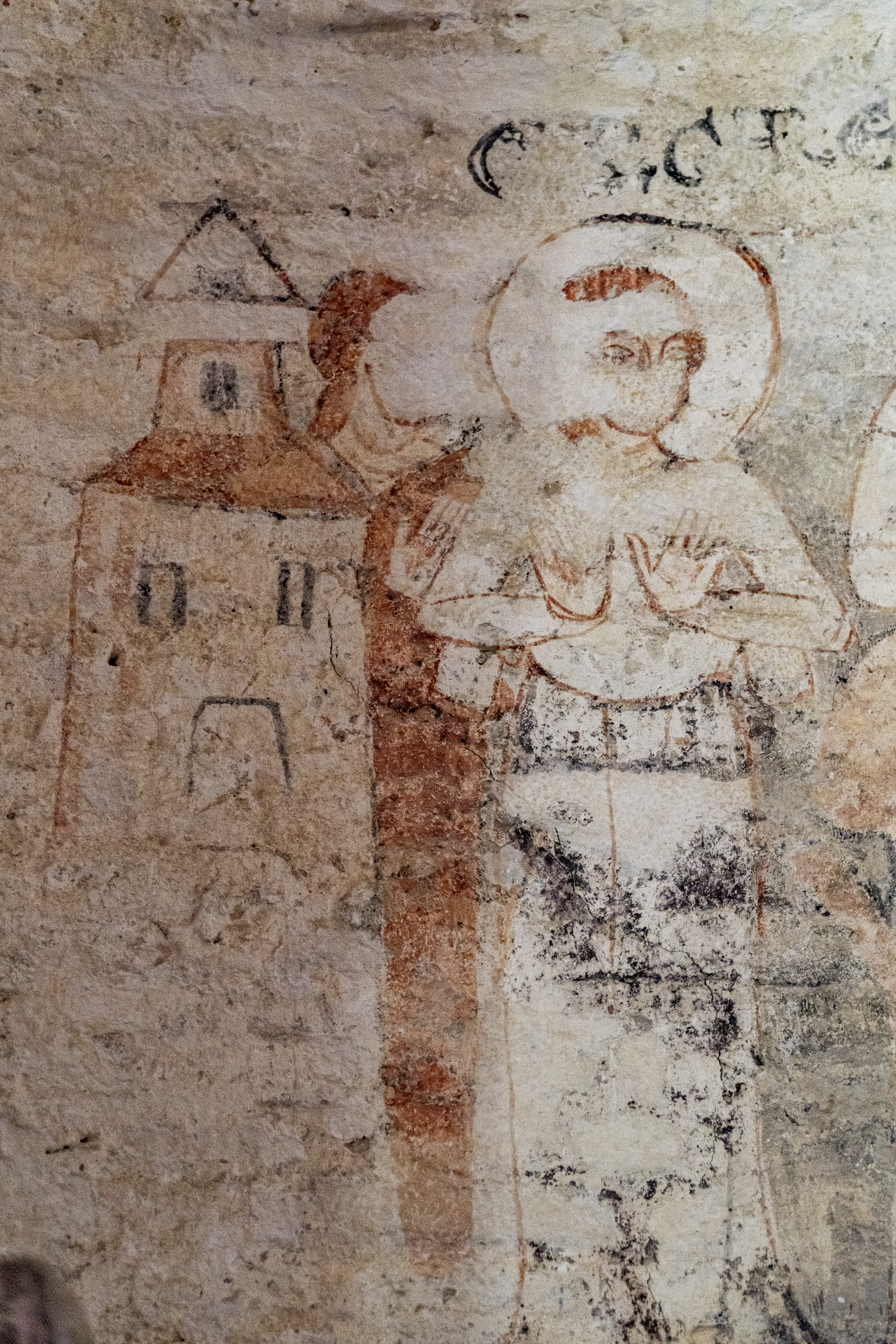
Fresco showing former image of rotunda
