= Fundamentally based indexes =

Fundamentally based indexes or fundamental indexes, also called fundamentally weighted indexes, are indexes in which stocks are weighted according to factors related to their fundamentals such as earnings, dividends and assets, commonly used when performing corporate valuations. This fundamental weight may be calculated statically, or it may be adjusted by the security's fundamental to market capitalization ratio to further neutralize the price factor between different securities. Indexes that use a composite of several fundamental factors attempt to average out sector biases that may arise from relying on a single fundamental factor. A key belief behind the fundamental index methodology is that underlying corporate accounting/valuation figures are more accurate estimators of a company's intrinsic value, rather than the listed market value of the company, i.e. that one should buy and sell companies in line with their accounting figures rather than according to their current market prices. In this sense fundamental indexing is linked to so-called fundamental analysis.

The fundamental factors commonly used by fundamental index managers are sales, earnings, book value, cash flow and dividends. Even the number of employees have been used in empirical studies on fundamental indexation. Fundamental indices are often contrasted to capitalization-weighted indices. Fundamentally based indices were arguably pioneered by Research Affiliates (RA), which first circulated research on the methodology in mid-2004. However, the method is in practice very similar to the so-called Core Equity Strategy-method launched by Dimensional Fund Advisors (DFA) during the same year. They are similar since DFA evaluates weight of small cap stocks and value stocks in a direct way whereas RA evaluates weight of small cap stocks and value stocks in a more indirect way. Furthermore, fundamental indexation is also seen by some people as merely a practical application and repackaging of the findings of one of the most famous journal articles in modern financial economics: "The Cross-Section of Expected Stock Returns" by Fama & French (1992). This is because the key characteristic of fundamental indices is that they have a combined relative small cap and value stock tilt vs. a capitalization-weighted index, which is for example explicitly shown in a Swedish context by Olof Andersson (2009) in his Thesis "Irrational Indexation". Fundamental indices ride on the small cap and the value stock premiums which have been present in international stock markets during the last 30–40 years so it is not strange that they might beat the market.

== Rationale of weighting by fundamentals versus other methods of index weighting ==
The traditional method of capitalization-weighting indices might by definition imply overweighting overvalued stocks and underweighting undervalued stocks, assuming a price inefficiency. Since investors cannot observe the true fair value of a company, they cannot remove inefficiency altogether but may be able to remove the systematic inefficiency that is arguably inherent in capitalization-weighted indices. Equal-weighting is one method to remove this claimed inefficiency but suffers from high turnover, high volatility, and the requirement to invest potentially large sums in illiquid stocks.

Weighting by fundamental factors avoids the pitfalls of equal weighting while still removing the claimed systematic inefficiency of capitalization weighting. It weights industries by fundamental factors (also called "Main Street" factors ) such as sales, book value, dividends, earnings, or employees. If a stock’s price gets either too high or too low relative to its fair value, weighting by fundamentals will not reflect this bias as far as there is not perfect correlation between stock prices and economic fundamentals. However, the correlation is quite close since the economic fundamentals used are commonly driving the value of a stock. If we assume no correlation in line with Robert Arnott, this arguably prevents fundamentally based indices from participating in bubbles and crashes and thus reduces its volatility while delivering a higher return. However, the strong underperformance of fundamental indices in 2008 when companies such as banks with large fundamentals crashed has shown that it may not prevent it from participating in stock market crashes. When fundamentals change rapidly so may the stock price.

== Empirical evidence ==
If the assumptions of the Capital Asset Pricing Model (CAPM) do not hold then there could be three states of the world in line with the so-called joint hypothesis problem explained by Campbell (1997):

1. The capitalization-weighted market portfolio is not efficient.
2. The CAPM model is not an efficient pricing model.
3. Both the cap-weighted market portfolio and the CAPM model are inefficient.

If we assume that the capitalization-weighted market portfolio is not efficient, assuming a pricing inefficiency, capitalization-weighting might be sub-optimal and the degree of sub-performance might be proportional to the degree of random noise.

Forty years of back-tested Indices weighted by any of several fundamental factors including sales, EBIT, earnings, cash flow, book value, or dividends in U.S. markets outperformed the S&P 500 by approximately 2% per annum with volatility similar to the S&P 500. Thus, fundamentally based indices also had a higher Sharpe ratio than capitalization-weighted indices. In non-U.S. markets, fundamentally based indices outperformed capitalization weighted indices by approximately 2.5% with slightly less volatility and outperformed in all 23 MSCI EAFE countries.

Financial economists — Walkshäusl and Lobe — investigate the performance of global and 50 country-specific (28 developed and 22 emerging) fundamentally weighted indices compared to capitalization-weighted indices between 1982 and 2008. First, they establish that superior performance of domestic indices diminishes considerably when applying a bootstrap procedure for robust performance testing. Second, even after controlling for data snooping biases and the value premium, they find evidence that fundamental indexing produces economically and statistically significant positive alphas. This holds for global and country-specific versions which are heavily weighted in the world portfolio.

In a 2023 empirical update, Research Affiliates confirmed the original 2004 research with a finding that fundamental indexation outperformed the Russell 1000 Index by 1.5% with equal volatility from 1988–2022. The paper found a smaller outperformance of 0.6% from 2005–2022, which the authors attributed to the extraordinary outperformance of growth stocks compared to value stocks in the post-GFC period.

== Criticisms and responses ==
Since the first research was disseminated, fundamentally based indices have been criticized by proponents of capitalization weighting including John Bogle, Burton Malkiel, and William Sharpe. The opposing opinions rely heavily on opposing assumptions. Proponents claiming a new revolutionary paradigm in index fund investing such as for example Robert D. Arnott, Jeremy Siegel and Jack Treynor — all affiliated with fundamental index funds — assume somewhat irrational markets whereas the opponents mentioned — some affiliated with conventional index funds — assume more rational and efficient markets. Responses to criticisms have come primarily from the publications of one of the founders of fundamentally based indices, Robert Arnott.

- Fundamentally based indexes are really being actively managed. By avoiding capitalization weighting, they are making bets that certain stocks will outperform the market.
  - Response: Although not necessarily generalizable, referring to his own company’s fundamentally based indices, Robert Arnott said, “Our fundamental index is formulaic, transparent, and is objectively and rigorously constructed.... The [free-float capitalization weighted] S&P 500 is not objective. It is not formulaic. It is not transparent. And it is not replicable.”
- Fundamentally based indices are exposed to the Fama–French risk factors — that is they are value-biased and small cap-biased. These factors have historically led to outperformance. The current returns of fundamentally based indices are exaggerated because of the recent strong performance of value stocks during the last 30 years and the outperformance of small cap stocks.
  - Response: It is true that the Fama–French factors explain much of the returns of fundamentally based indices as they do for most passive portfolios. If they did not, it would demonstrate a flaw in the Fama–French model. After controlling for Fama–French risk factors, fundamentally based indices exhibit a small positive alpha — albeit a statistically insignificant one.
- Fundamentally based indices have higher turnover and therefore higher costs than capitalization weighted indices.
  - Response: Fundamentally based indices do have a higher turnover than capitalization weighted indices. However, the turnover is so low that its costs do not substantially affect returns. For example, the U.S. Fundamental Index 1000’s turnover ranges between 10 and 12 percent per annum versus 6% for an annually rebalanced capitalization-weighted index of the largest 1000 stocks. Furthermore, fundamentally based indices experience most of their turnover in large, liquid stocks while capitalization-weighted indices experience most of their turnover in small, illiquid stocks.
- Fundamentally based index funds have higher expense ratios than the traditional capitalization weighted index funds. For example, the Powershares fundamentally based ETFs have an expense ratio of 0.6% (the U.S. index ETF has an expense ratio of 0.39%) while the PIMCO Fundamental IndexPLUS TR Fund charges 1.14% in annual expenses. In comparison, the Vanguard 500 Index Fund "Investor shares" ($3,000, minimum investment) charges 0.18% per annum, whereas the Vanguard 500 Index Fund "Admiral shares" ($10,000, minimum investment) charges 0.05% per annum.
  - Response: Fundamentally based ETFs do have higher expense ratios than capitalization-weighted ones but the 2 to 2.5% of additional returns per annum far outweigh the additional expenses incurred.
  - Schwab Fundamental Index ETFs have lower expense ratios, 0.25% for the U.S. version.
- Fundamentally based indices ignore information from the variance-covariance structure of returns. Thus, the covariance structure is under-utilized despite the fact it has some predictive power - "Past correlations predict future correlations much better that past returns predict future returns."
