= Tulip mania =

17th-century economic bubble in the Netherlands

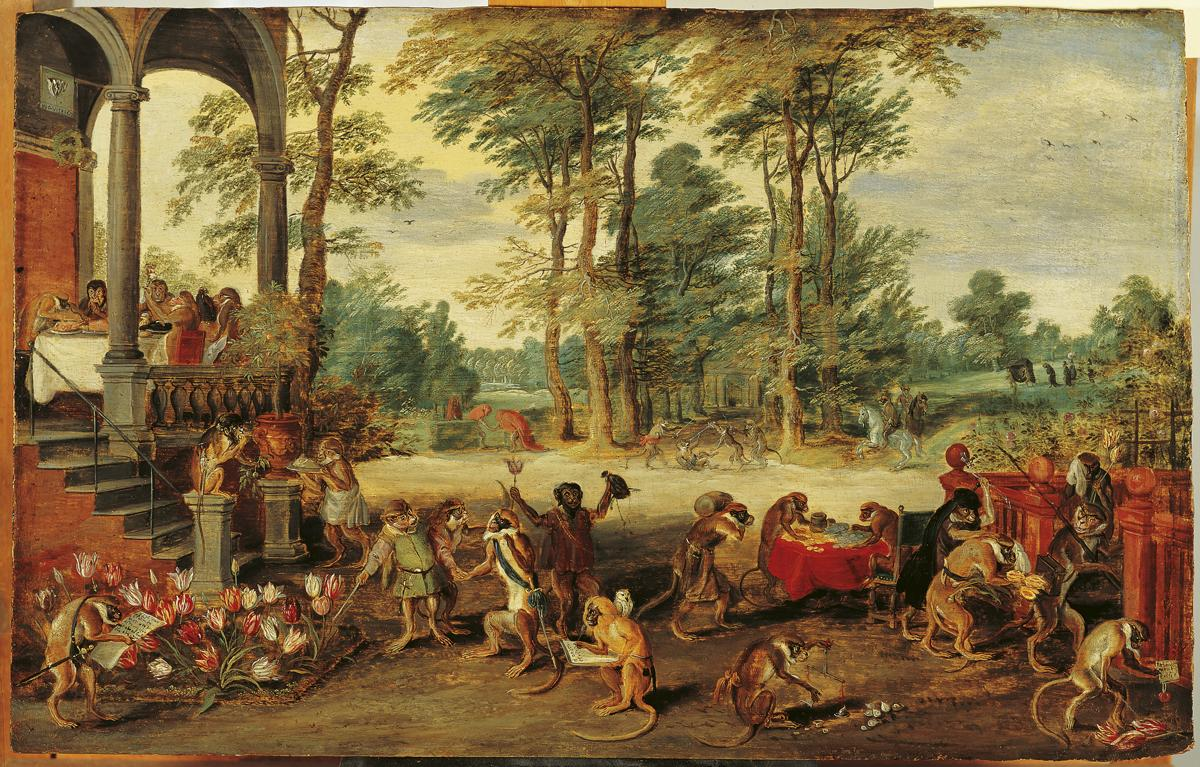
- A Satire of Tulip Mania by Jan Brueghel the Younger (c. 1640) depicts speculators as brainless monkeys in contemporary upper-class dress. In a commentary on the economic folly, one monkey urinates on the previously valuable plants, others appear in debtor's court and one is carried to the grave.
- Native name: tulpenmanie
- Date: 1634–February 1637
- Location: Dutch Republic
- Also known as: tulpomania
- Type: market bubble and collapse

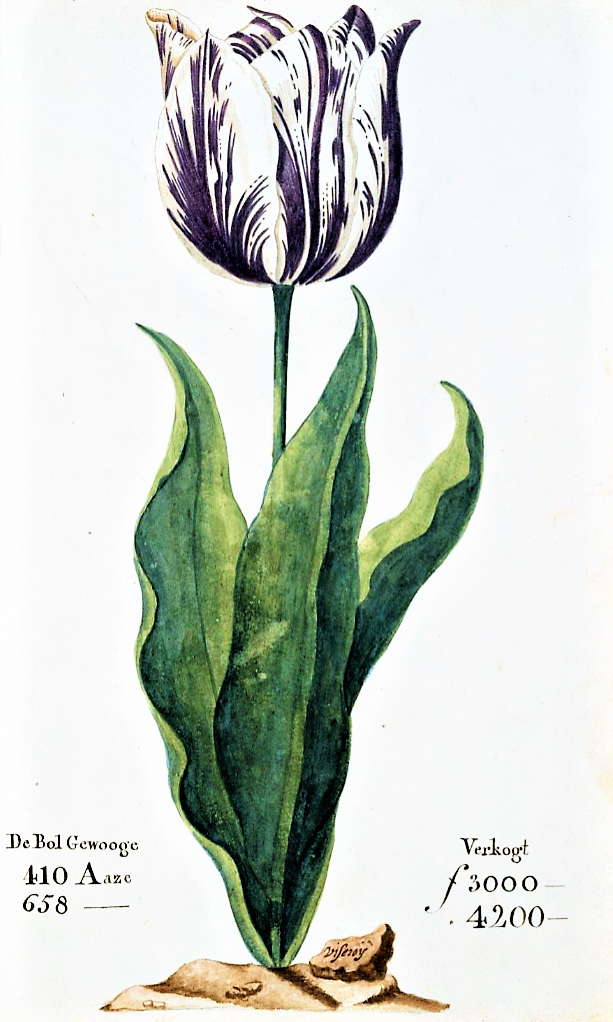
A tulip, known as "the Viceroy" (viseroij), displayed in the 1637 Dutch auction catalogue Verzameling van een Meenigte Tulipaanen ("Collection of a set of Tulips") by Pieter Cos. Its bulb was offered for sale between ƒ3,000-4,200, depending on weight (gewooge). A skilled artisan at the time earned about ƒ300 per year.

Tulip mania (Dutch: tulpenmanie) was a period during the Dutch Golden Age when contract prices for some bulbs of the recently introduced and fashionable tulip reached extraordinarily high levels. The major acceleration started in 1634 and then dramatically collapsed in February 1637. It is generally considered to have been the first recorded speculative bubble or asset bubble in history.

In many ways, the tulip mania was more of a socio-economic phenomenon than a significant economic crisis. It had no critical influence on the prosperity of the Dutch Republic (now the Netherlands), which was one of the world's leading economic and financial powers in the 17th century, with the highest per capita income in the world from circa 1600 to 1720.

The term tulip mania is now often used metaphorically to refer to any large economic bubble when asset prices deviate from intrinsic values.

Forward markets appeared in the Dutch Republic during the 17th century. Among the most notable was one centred on the tulip market. At the peak of tulip mania in February 1637, certain tulip bulbs sold for more than 10 times the annual income of a skilled artisan. The Semper Augustus was the most expensive tulip during the mania, which at its peak sold for ƒ10,000 (in guilders; equivalent to approximately €130,000 in 2024). Research is difficult because of the limited economic data from the 1630s, much of which comes from biased and speculative sources. Some modern economists have proposed rational explanations rather than a speculative mania for the rise and fall in prices. For example, other flowers such as the hyacinth also had high initial prices at the time of their introduction, which then fell as the plants were propagated. The high prices may also have been driven by expectations of a parliamentary decree that contracts could be voided for a small cost, thus lowering the risk to buyers.

The 1637 event gained attention in 1841 with the publication of the book Extraordinary Popular Delusions and the Madness of Crowds, written by Scottish journalist Charles Mackay, who writes that at one point 5 hectares (12 acres) of land were offered for a Semper Augustus bulb. Mackay claims that many investors were ruined by the fall in prices and that Dutch commerce suffered a severe shock. Although Mackay's book is often referenced, his account is contested. Many modern scholars believe that the mania was not as destructive as he describes.

== Background and history ==
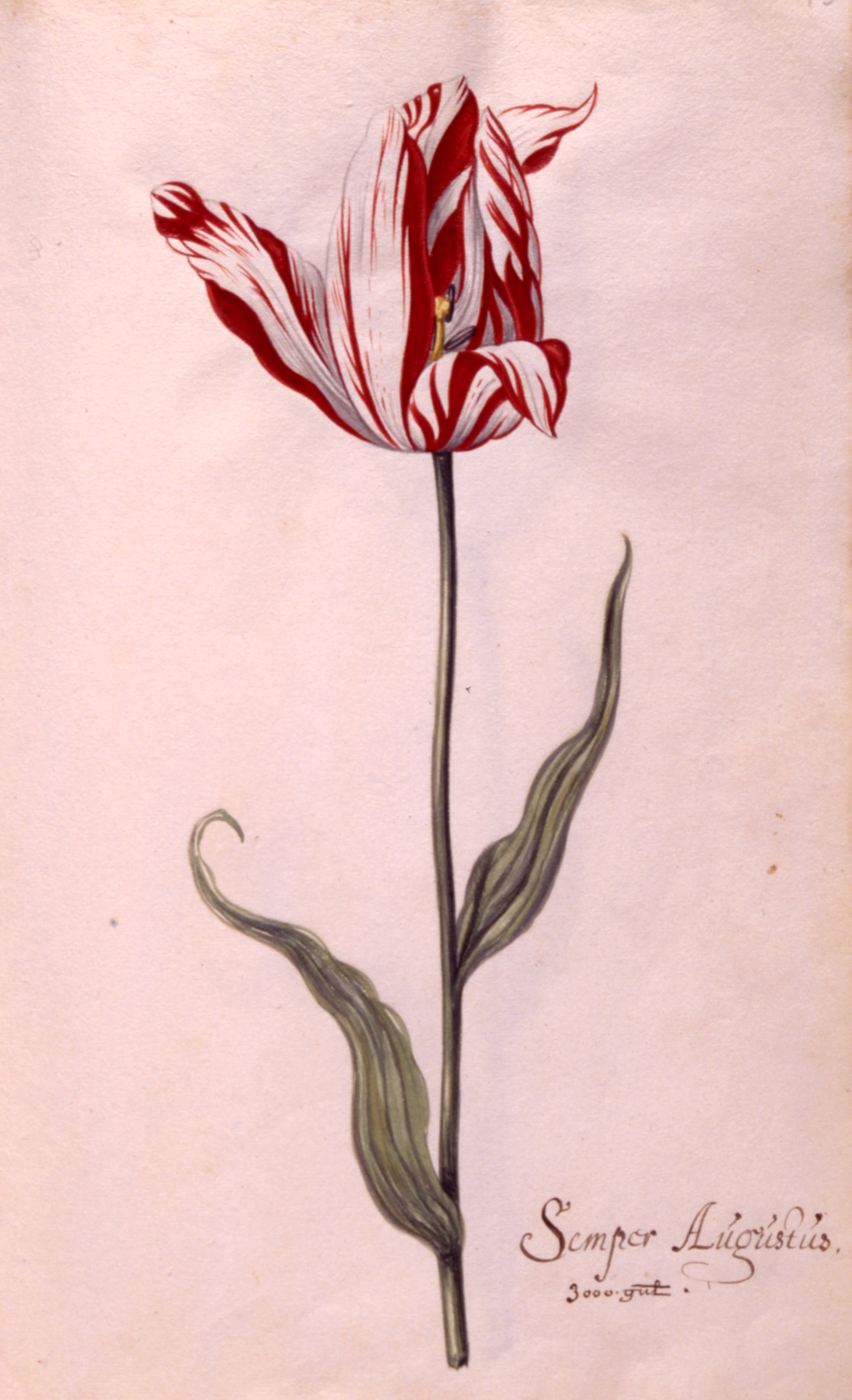
Semper Augustus (17th century) anonymous watercolour in the Tulip book of the Six Collection, Rijksmuseum, Amsterdam. The Semper Augustus is famous for being the most expensive tulip sold during the tulip mania. The note states that the specimen was sold for ƒ3000 (~€38.000 in 2024).

=== Dutch tulip business ===
The introduction of the tulip to Europe is often attributed to Ogier de Busbecq—the ambassador of Charles V, Holy Roman Emperor, to Sultan Suleiman the Magnificent—who sent the first tulip bulbs and seeds to Vienna in 1554 from the Ottoman Empire. These bulbs were soon distributed from Vienna to Augsburg, Antwerp, and Amsterdam.

Southern Netherlandish botanist Carolus Clusius is largely responsible for the spread of tulip bulbs in the final years of the 16th century; he planted tulips at the Vienna Imperial Botanical Gardens in 1573. He finished the first major work on tulips in 1592, in which he notes the colour variations. Their popularity and cultivation in the Dutch Republic started in earnest around 1593 after Clusius had taken up a post at Leiden University in the newly established Hortus Botanicus. He planted his collection of tulip bulbs in a teaching garden and his private garden in late 1593 and found that they were able to tolerate the harsher conditions of the Low Countries. Shortly thereafter, the tulip grew in popularity. The spring of 1594 is considered the tulip's first flowering in the Netherlands, despite reports of the cultivation of tulips in private gardens in Antwerp and Amsterdam two or three decades earlier. These tulips at Leiden eventually led to both the tulip mania and the tulip industry in the Netherlands. Over two raids, in 1596 and in 1598, more than one hundred bulbs were stolen from his garden.

The tulip was different from other flowers known to Europe at that time because of its intense saturated petal colour. The appearance of the nonpareil tulip as a status symbol coincides with the rise of the Dutch Republic's trade fortunes. No longer under Spanish reign, its economic resources could be channelled into commerce, and the Netherlands embarked on its Golden Age. Amsterdam merchants were at the centre of the lucrative East Indies trade, where one voyage could yield profits of 400%. Around this time, the ceramic tulipiere was devised for the display of cut flowers stem by stem. Vases and bouquets, usually including tulips, often appeared in Dutch still-life painting.

As a result, tulips rapidly became a coveted luxury item, and a profusion of varieties followed. They were classified in groups: the single-hued tulips of red, yellow, or white were known as Couleren; the multicoloured Rosen (white streaks on a red or pink background); Violetten (white streaks on a purple or lilac background); and the rarest of all, the Bizarden ('Bizarres') (yellow or white streaks on a red, brown, or purple background). The multicolour effects of intricate lines and flame-like streaks on the petals were vivid and spectacular, making the bulbs that produced these even more exotic-looking plants highly sought after. It is now known that this effect is produced when the bulbs are infected with a type of tulip-specific mosaic virus known as the "tulip breaking virus", so called because it "breaks" the one petal colour into two or more. Less conspicuously, the virus also progressively impairs the tulip's production of daughter bulbs.

The Semper Augustus was the most expensive tulip during the tulip mania; during the peak this tulip was sold for ƒ10.000 (~€130.000 in 2024). After seeing the tulip in the garden of Dr. Adriaan Pauw, a director of the Dutch East India Company, Nicolas van Wassenaer wrote in 1624 "The colour is white, with carmine on a blue base, and with an unbroken flame right to the top". Semper Augustus was actually not a tulip variety but rather a tulip affected by the tulip mosaic virus. With limited specimens in existence at the time and most owned by Pauw, his refusal to sell any flowers despite wildly escalating offers is believed by some to have sparked the mania. Historian Philipp Blom theorises in his book Nature's mutiny that the mania might also have been driven by the effects of the Little Ice Age, which left most other flowers dry and shrivelled by the temperature, while the tulip was the one which sustained itself.

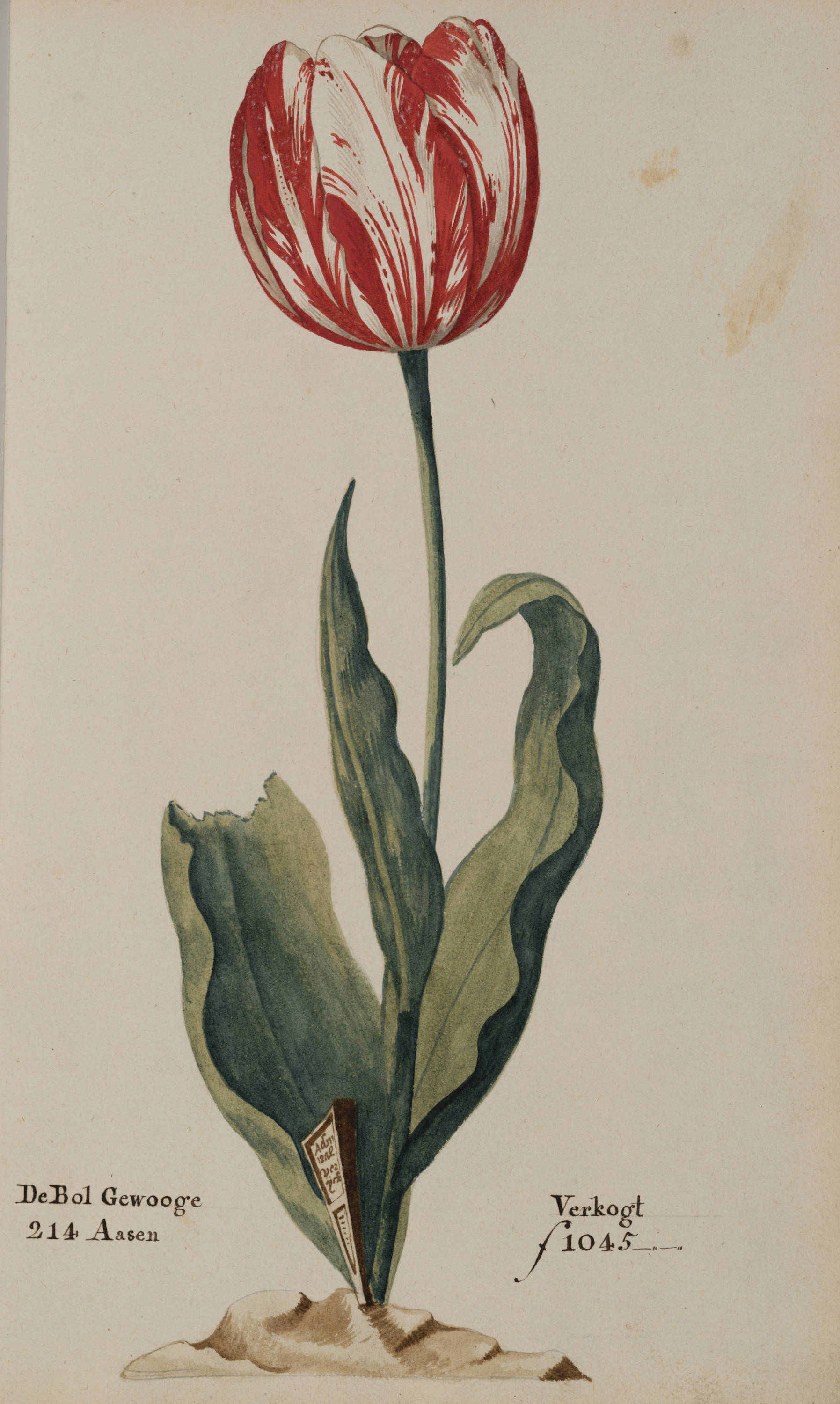
Admirael van der Eijck from the 1637 catalogue by Pieter Cos, sold for ƒ1045 on February 5, 1637

Growers named their new varieties with exalted titles. Many early forms were prefixed Admirael ('admiral'), often combined with the growers' names: Admirael van der Eijck was perhaps the most highly regarded of about 50 so named. Generael ('general') was another prefix used for around 30 varieties. Later varieties were given even more extravagant names, derived from Alexander the Great or Scipio, or even "Admiral of Admirals" and "General of Generals". Naming could be haphazard and varieties highly variable in quality. Most of these varieties have since died out.

The tulips bloomed in April and May for about one week. During the plant's dormant phase from June to September, bulbs can be uprooted and moved about, so actual purchases (in the spot market) occurred during these months. During the rest of the year, florists, or tulip traders, signed forward contracts before a notary to buy tulips at the end of the season. Thus the Dutch—who developed many of the techniques of modern finance—created a market for tulip bulbs, which were durable goods. Short selling was banned by an edict of 1610, which was reiterated or strengthened in 1621 and 1630, and again in 1636. Short sellers were not prosecuted under these edicts, but forward contracts were deemed unenforceable, so traders could repudiate deals if faced with a loss.

=== Speculative period ===
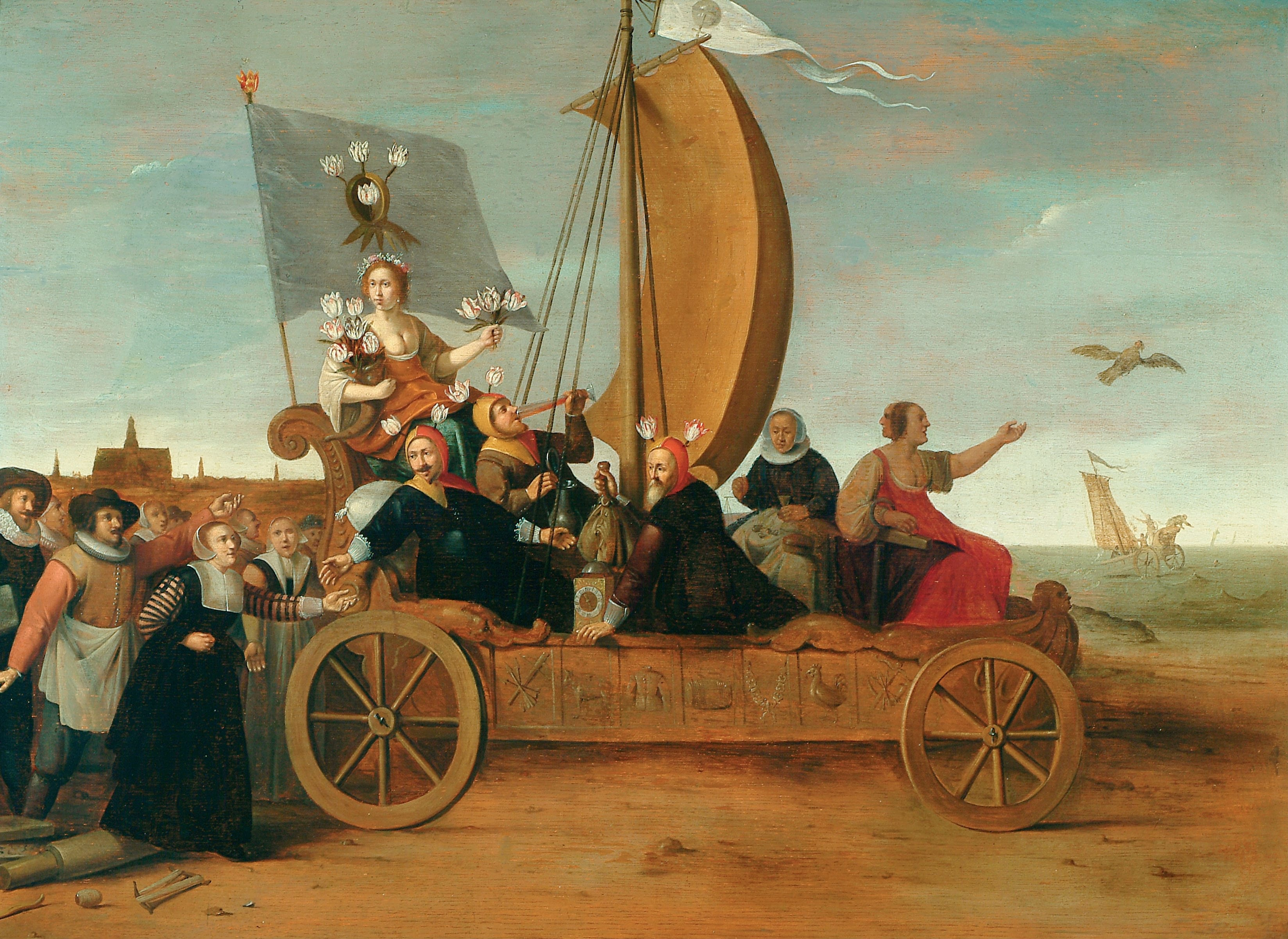
Wagon of Fools by Hendrik Gerritsz Pot, 1637. Haarlem weavers chase a wind-borne wagon flying a fool's cap flag. Flora, goddess of flowers, rides aboard to destruction in the sea with the vices Fraud, Gluttony and Avarice, Mrs. Mania, and Idle Hope/Fortuna.

A standardised price index for tulip bulb contracts, created by Earl Thompson. Thompson had no price data between February 9 and May 1, thus the shape of the decline is unknown. The tulip market is known to have collapsed abruptly in February.

As the flowers grew in popularity, professional growers paid higher and higher prices for bulbs with the virus, and prices rose steadily. By 1634 speculators began to enter the market, partly as a result of demand from the French. The contract price of rare bulbs continued to rise throughout 1636. By November, the price of common, "unbroken" bulbs also began to increase, so that any tulip bulb could fetch hundreds of guilders.

Traders met in "college" at taverns, and buyers were required to pay a 2.5% "wine money" fee, up to a maximum of ƒ3,- per trade. Neither party paid an initial margin nor a mark-to-market margin, and all contracts were with the individual counter-parties rather than with the town exchanges. The Dutch described tulip contract trading as windhandel ('air trade'), because no bulbs were actually changing hands. The entire business was accomplished on the margins of Dutch economic life, not in the exchange.

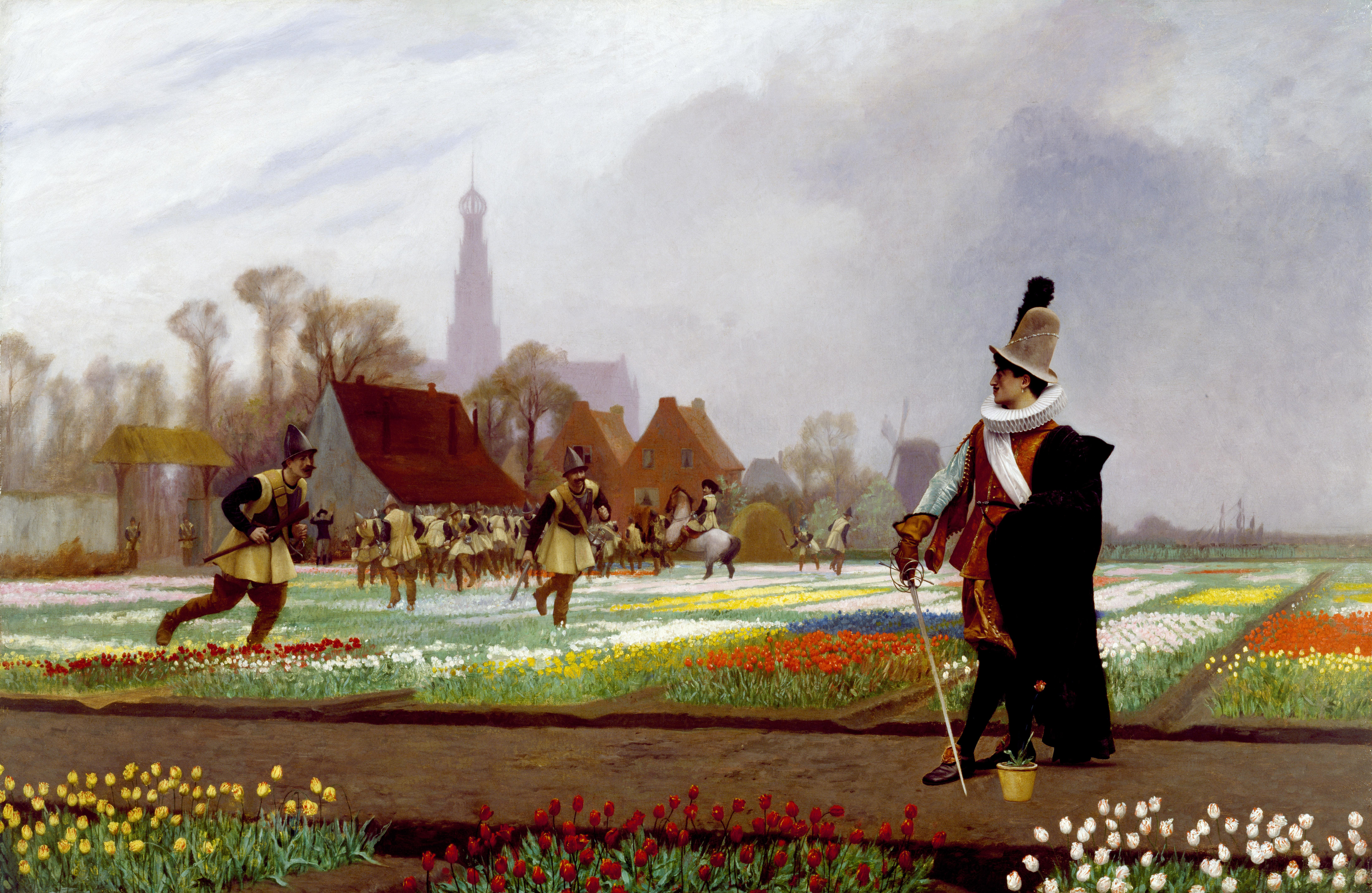
The Tulip Folly, by Jean-Léon Gérôme (1882)

Tulip mania reached its peak during the winter of 1636–37, when some contracts were changing hands five times. No deliveries were made to fulfil these contracts because in February 1637 tulip bulb contract prices collapsed abruptly, and the trade of tulips ground to a halt. A contemporary satire suggests that the crisis started to unravel on February 3 in Haarlem, where an auctioneer failed to find willing buyers despite lowering the asking price several times. The actual circumstances of the crash are unknown. The collapse seems to have occurred by the end of the first week of February 1637, which caused disputes over the extant contracts. On February 7, tulip growers scrambled in Utrecht to elect representatives for a national assembly in Amsterdam. Their situation had become uncertain as the buyers no longer had any interest in honouring the contracts, and there was no legal basis for enforcing them.

By the end of February, the representatives gathered in Amsterdam for deliberations. They decided on a compromise where all contracts entered before December 1636 would be binding, but later contracts could be cancelled by paying a fee amounting to 10% of the price. The matter was brought before the court which declined to rule and referred the question back to the city councils. The Dutch legislature decided to cancel all contracts to allow fresh deals to be struck during the summer. In Haarlem the issue dragged on, since the government left it to the parties to solve their issues by arbitration or other means. In May the city ruled that buyers could cancel any extant contracts at a fee of 3.5% of the price. The Dutch court system remained busy with tulip disputes throughout 1639. In the end, most contracts were simply never honoured.

== Available price data ==
The lack of consistently recorded price data from the 1630s makes the extent of the tulip mania difficult to discern. The bulk of available data comes from an anonymous satire, Dialogues between Waermondt and Gaergoedt, written just after the bubble. Economist Peter M. Garber collected data on the sales of 161 bulbs of 39 varieties between 1633 and 1637, with 53 being recorded in the Dialogues.

Ninety eight sales are recorded for the last date of the bubble, February 5, 1637, at wildly varying prices. The sales were made using several market mechanisms: forward trading at the colleges, spot sales by growers, notarised forward sales by growers, and estate sales. "To a great extent, the available price data are a blend of apples and oranges", according to Garber.

== Mackay's Madness of Crowds ==
Basket of goods allegedly exchanged for a single bulb of the Viceroy
Item	Value in Dutch guilders
Two lasts of wheat	ƒ448
Four lasts of rye	ƒ558
Four fat oxen	ƒ480
Eight fat swine	ƒ240
Twelve fat sheep	ƒ120
Two okshoofden (464L) of wine	ƒ70
Four tuns (4kL) of beer	ƒ32
Two tuns (2kL) of butter	ƒ192
1,000 ponden (494kg) of cheese	ƒ120
A complete bed	ƒ100
A suit of clothes	ƒ80
A silver drinking cup	ƒ60
Total (equal to the Viceroy)	ƒ2500

The modern discussion of tulip mania began with the book Extraordinary Popular Delusions and the Madness of Crowds, published in 1841 by the Scottish journalist Charles Mackay. He proposes that crowds of people often behave irrationally, and tulip mania is—along with the South Sea Bubble and the Mississippi Company scheme—one of his primary examples. His account was largely sourced from a 1797 work by Johann Beckmann titled A History of Inventions, Discoveries, and Origins. Beckmann in turn used several available sources, but all of them drew heavily from the satirical Dialogues that were written to mock the speculators. Mackay's vivid book was popular among generations of economists and stock market participants. His popular but flawed description of tulip mania as a speculative bubble remains prominent, even though since the 1980s economists have debunked many aspects of his account.

According to Mackay, the growing popularity of tulips in the early 17th century caught the attention of the entire nation; "the population, even to its lowest dregs, embarked in the tulip trade". By 1635, a sale of 40 bulbs for ƒ100,000 was recorded. By way of comparison, a "tun" (930 kg or 2,050 lb) of butter cost around ƒ100, a skilled labourer might earn ƒ150–350 a year, and "eight fat swine" cost ƒ240.

By 1636, tulips were traded on the exchanges of numerous Dutch towns and cities. This encouraged trade by all members of society. Mackay recounts people selling possessions in order to speculate on the tulip market, such as an offer of 5 ha (12 acres) of land for one of two existing Semper Augustus bulbs, or a single bulb of the Viceroy that he says was purchased in exchange for a basket of goods (shown in table) worth ƒ2,500.

Many individuals suddenly became rich. A golden bait hung temptingly out before the people, and, one after the other, they rushed to the tulip marts, like flies around a honey-pot. Every one imagined that the passion for tulips would last for ever, and that the wealthy from every part of the world would send to the Dutch Republic, and pay whatever prices were asked for them. The riches of Europe would be concentrated on the shores of the Zuyder Zee (Zuiderzee), and poverty banished from the favoured clime of the Dutch Republic. Nobles, citizens, farmers, mechanics, seamen, footmen, maidservants, even chimney sweeps and old clotheswomen, dabbled in tulips.

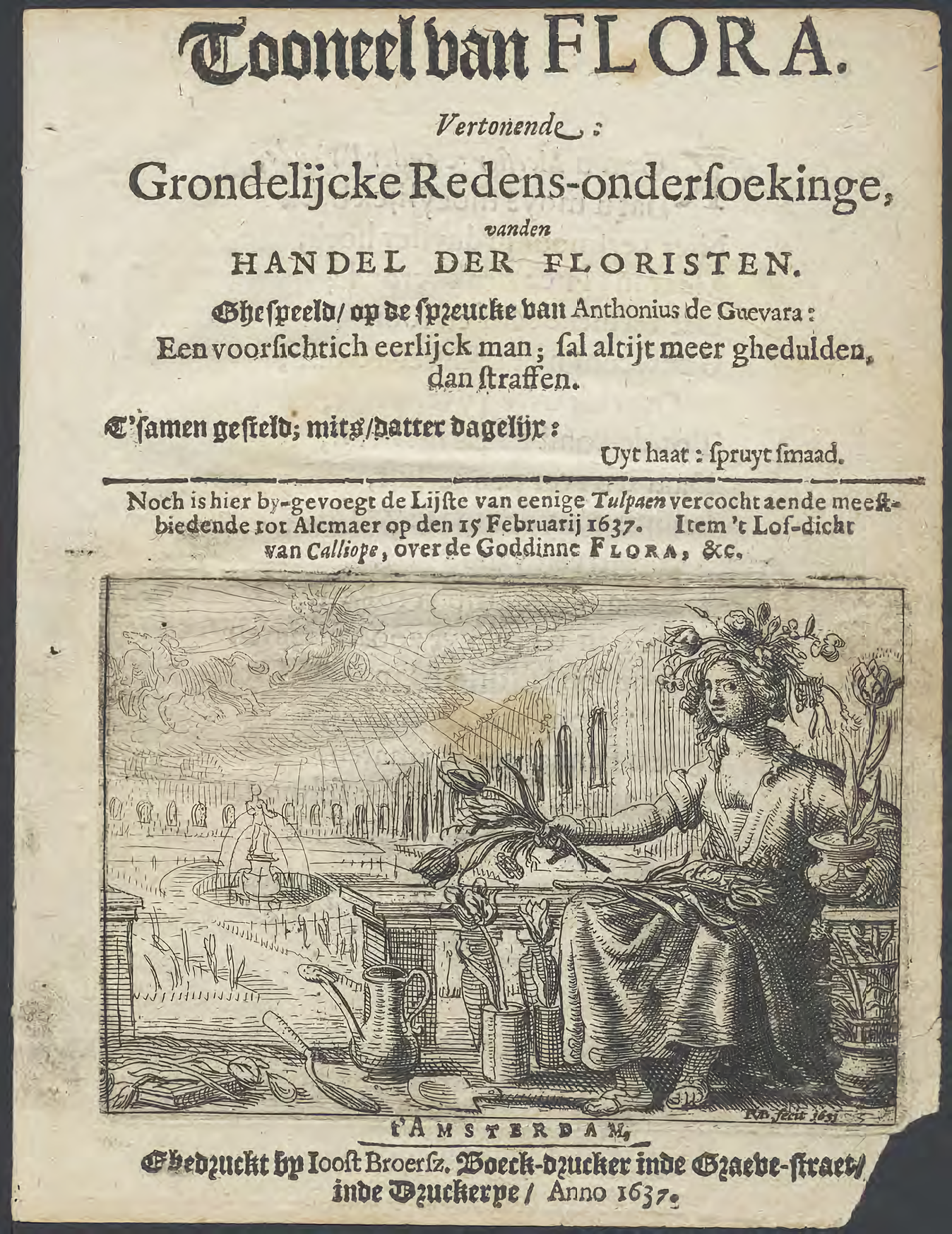
Pamphlet of a theatre play on the tulipomania (Amsterdam, 1637)

The increasing mania generated several amusing, if unlikely, anecdotes that Mackay recounts, such as a sailor who mistakes the valuable tulip bulb of a merchant for an onion and grabs it to eat. The merchant and his family hunt down the sailor to find him "eating a breakfast whose cost might have regaled a whole ship's crew for a twelvemonth"; the sailor is supposedly jailed for eating the bulb. However, tulips are poisonous if prepared incorrectly, taste bad, and are considered to be only marginally edible even during famines. This directly contradicts Mackay's claim that the tulip bulb had been "quite delicious".

People were purchasing bulbs at higher and higher prices, intending to re-sell them for a profit. Such a scheme could not last unless someone was ultimately willing to pay such high prices and take possession of the bulbs. In February 1637, tulip traders could no longer find new buyers willing to pay increasingly inflated prices for their bulbs. As this realisation set in, the demand for tulips collapsed and prices plummeted—the speculative bubble burst. Some were left holding contracts to purchase tulips at prices ten times greater than those on the open market, while others found themselves in possession of bulbs worth a fraction of the price they had paid. Mackay says the Dutch devolved into distressed accusations and recriminations against others in the trade.

In Mackay's account, the panicked tulip speculators sought help from the government of the Netherlands, which responded by declaring that anyone who had bought contracts to purchase bulbs in the future could void their contract by payment of a 10% fee. Attempts were made to resolve the situation to the satisfaction of all parties, but these were unsuccessful. The mania finally ended, Mackay says, with individuals stuck with the bulbs they held at the end of the crash—no court would enforce payment of a contract, since judges regarded the debts as contracted through gambling, and thus not enforceable by law.

According to Mackay, lesser tulip manias also occurred in other parts of Europe, although matters never reached the state they had in the Netherlands. He surmises that the aftermath of the tulip price deflation led to a widespread economic chill throughout the Netherlands for many years afterwards.

== Modern views ==
Mackay's account of inexplicable mania went unchallenged and mostly unexamined until the 1980s. Research into tulip mania since then, especially by proponents of the efficient-market hypothesis, suggests that his story was incomplete and inaccurate. In her 2007 scholarly analysis Tulipmania, Anne Goldgar states that the phenomenon was limited to "a fairly small group" and that most accounts from the period "are based on one or two contemporary pieces of propaganda and a prodigious amount of plagiarism". Garber argues that the trade in common bulbs "was no more than a meaningless winter drinking game, played by a plague-ridden population that made use of the vibrant tulip market."

While Mackay's account holds that a wide array of society was involved in the tulip trade, Goldgar's study of archived contracts finds that even at its peak the trade in tulips was conducted almost exclusively by merchants and skilled craftsmen who were wealthy, but not members of the nobility. Any economic fallout from the bubble was very limited. Goldgar, who identifies many prominent buyers and sellers in the market, finds fewer than half a dozen who experienced financial troubles in the time period, and even of these cases it is not clear that tulips were to blame. This is not altogether surprising. Although prices had risen, money had not changed hands between buyers and sellers. Thus profits were never realised for sellers; unless sellers had made other purchases on credit in expectation of the profits, the collapse in prices did not cause anyone to lose money.

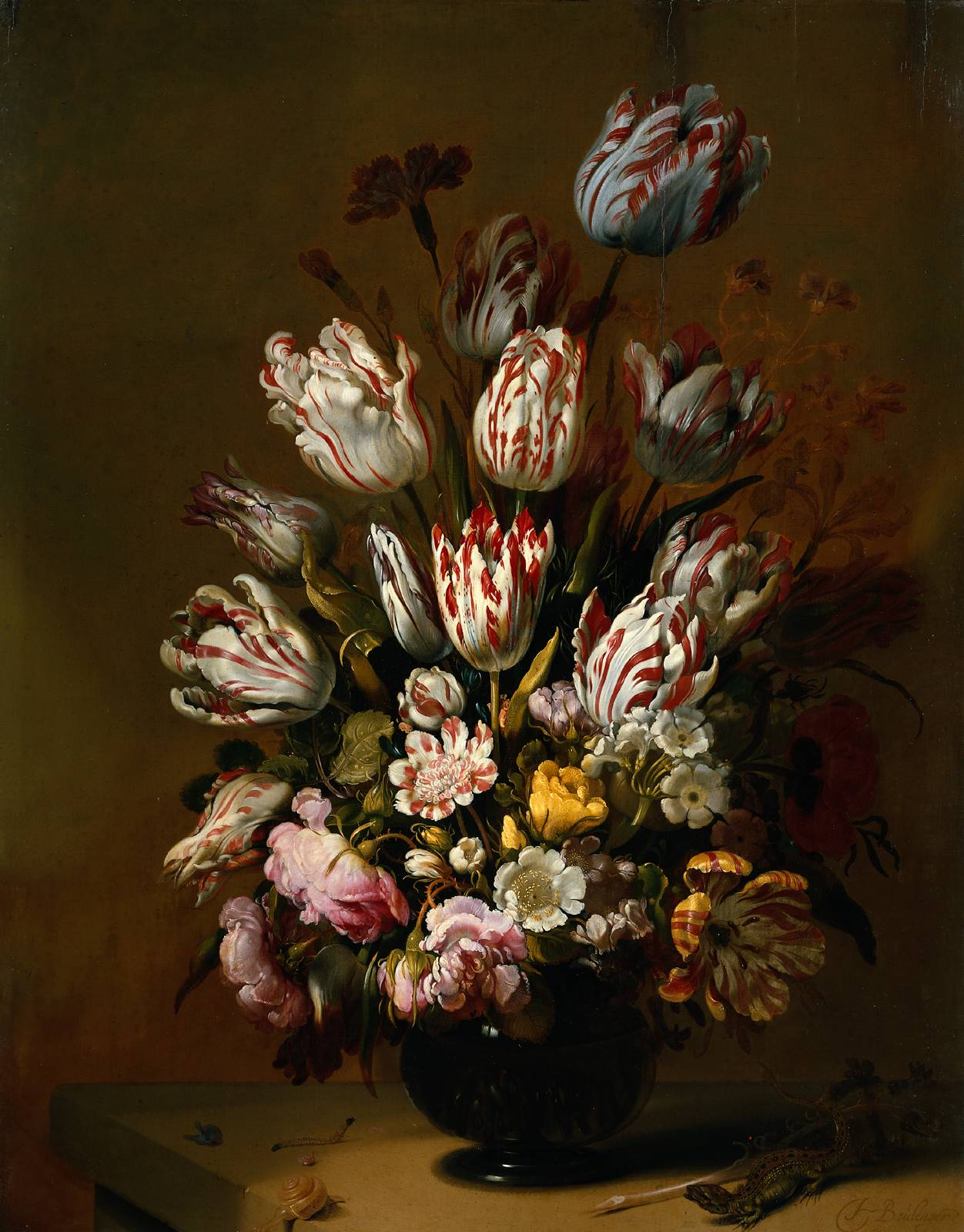
Still Life with Flowers (1639), by Hans Bollongier (1623–1672), showcases the prized Semper Augustus tulip.

=== Rational explanations ===
It is well established that prices for tulip bulb contracts rose and then fell between 1636 and 1637; however, such dramatic curves do not necessarily imply that an economic or speculative bubble developed and then burst. For the tulip mania to qualify as an economic bubble, the price of bulbs would need to have been mutually agreed and surpassed the intrinsic value of the bulbs. Modern economists have advanced several possible reasons for why the rise and fall in prices may not have constituted a bubble, even though a Viceroy Tulip was worth upwards of five times the cost of an average house at the time.

The increases of the 1630s corresponded with a lull in the Thirty Years' War. In 1634–1635 the German and Swedish armies lost ground in southern Germany, and Cardinal-Infante Ferdinand of Austria moved north. After the Peace of Prague the French and the Dutch decided to support the Swedish and German Protestants with money and arms against the Habsburg monarchy and to occupy the Spanish Netherlands in 1636. Hence market prices, at least initially, were responding rationally to a rise in demand. The fall in prices was faster and more dramatic than the rise.

=== Natural volatility in flower prices ===
Garber compares the available price data on tulips to hyacinth prices at the beginning of the 19th century when the hyacinth replaced the tulip as the fashionable flower and found a similar pattern. When hyacinths were introduced florists strove with one another to grow beautiful hyacinth flowers, as demand was strong. As people became more accustomed to hyacinths, the prices began to fall. The most expensive bulbs fell to 1-2% of their peak value within 30 years.

Garber notes that in 1989 "a small quantity of prototype lily bulbs recently was sold for ƒ1 million", demonstrating that even in the modern world, flowers can command extremely high prices. Because the rise in prices occurred after bulbs were planted for the year, growers would not have had an opportunity to increase production in response to price.

==== Critiques ====
Other economists believe that these elements cannot completely explain the dramatic rise and fall in tulip prices. Garber's theory has also been challenged for failing to explain a similar dramatic rise and fall in prices for regular tulip bulb contracts. Some economists point to other factors associated with speculative bubbles, such as a growth in the supply of money, demonstrated by an increase in deposits at the Bank of Amsterdam during that period.

=== Legal changes ===
Earl Thompson argues in a 2007 paper that Garber's explanation cannot account for the extremely swift drop in tulip bulb contract prices. The annualised rate of price decline was 99.999%, instead of the average 40% for other flowers. Thompson provides another explanation: in late 1636, the Dutch parliament had been considering a decree (originally sponsored by Dutch tulip investors who had lost money because of a German setback in the Thirty Years' War) that changed the way tulip contracts functioned:

On 24 February 1637, the self-regulating guild of Dutch florists, in a decision that was later ratified by the Dutch Parliament, announced that all futures contracts written after 30 November 1636, and before the re-opening of the cash market in the early Spring, were to be interpreted as option contracts. They did this by simply relieving the futures buyers of the obligation to buy the future tulips, forcing them merely to compensate the sellers with a small fixed percentage of the contract price.

Before this parliamentary decree, the purchaser of a tulip contract—known in modern finance as a forward contract—was legally obliged to buy the bulbs. The decree changed the nature of these contracts, so that if the current market price fell, the purchaser could opt to pay a penalty and forgo receipt of the bulb, rather than pay the full contracted price. This change in law meant that, in modern terminology, the forward contracts had been transformed into options contracts—contracts which were extremely favourable to the buyers.

Thompson argues that the "bubble" in the price of tulip bulb forward prior to the February 1637 decree was due primarily to buyers' awareness of what was coming. Although the final 3.5% premium was not actually settled until February 24, Thompson writes, "as information [...] entered the market in late November, contract prices soared to reflect the expectation that the contract price was now a call-option exercise, or strike, price rather than a price committed to be paid."

Thompson concludes "the real victims of the contractual conversion" were the investors who had bought forward contracts prior to November 30, 1636, on the incorrect assumption that their contracts would benefit from the February 1637 decree. In other words, many investors were making an "additional gamble with respect to the prices the buyers would eventually have to pay for their options"—a factor unrelated to the intrinsic value of the tulip bulbs.

Using data about the specific payoffs present in the forward and options contracts, Thompson argues that tulip bulb contract prices hewed closely to what a rational economic model would dictate: "Tulip contract prices before, during, and after the 'tulipmania' appear to provide a remarkable illustration of efficient market prices."

== Social mania and legacy ==
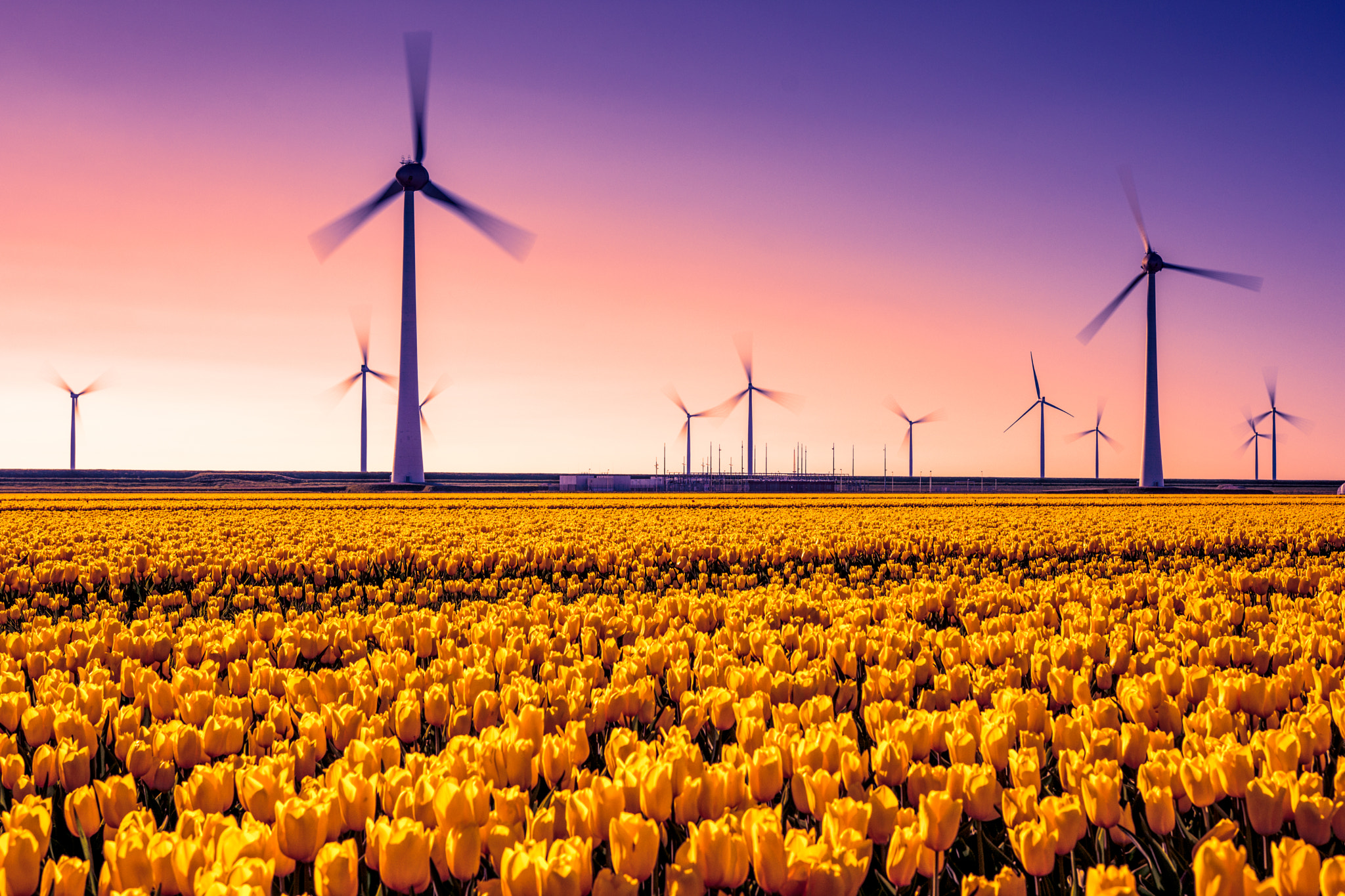
A modern-day field of tulips in the Netherlands; the flower remains a popular symbol of the Netherlands.

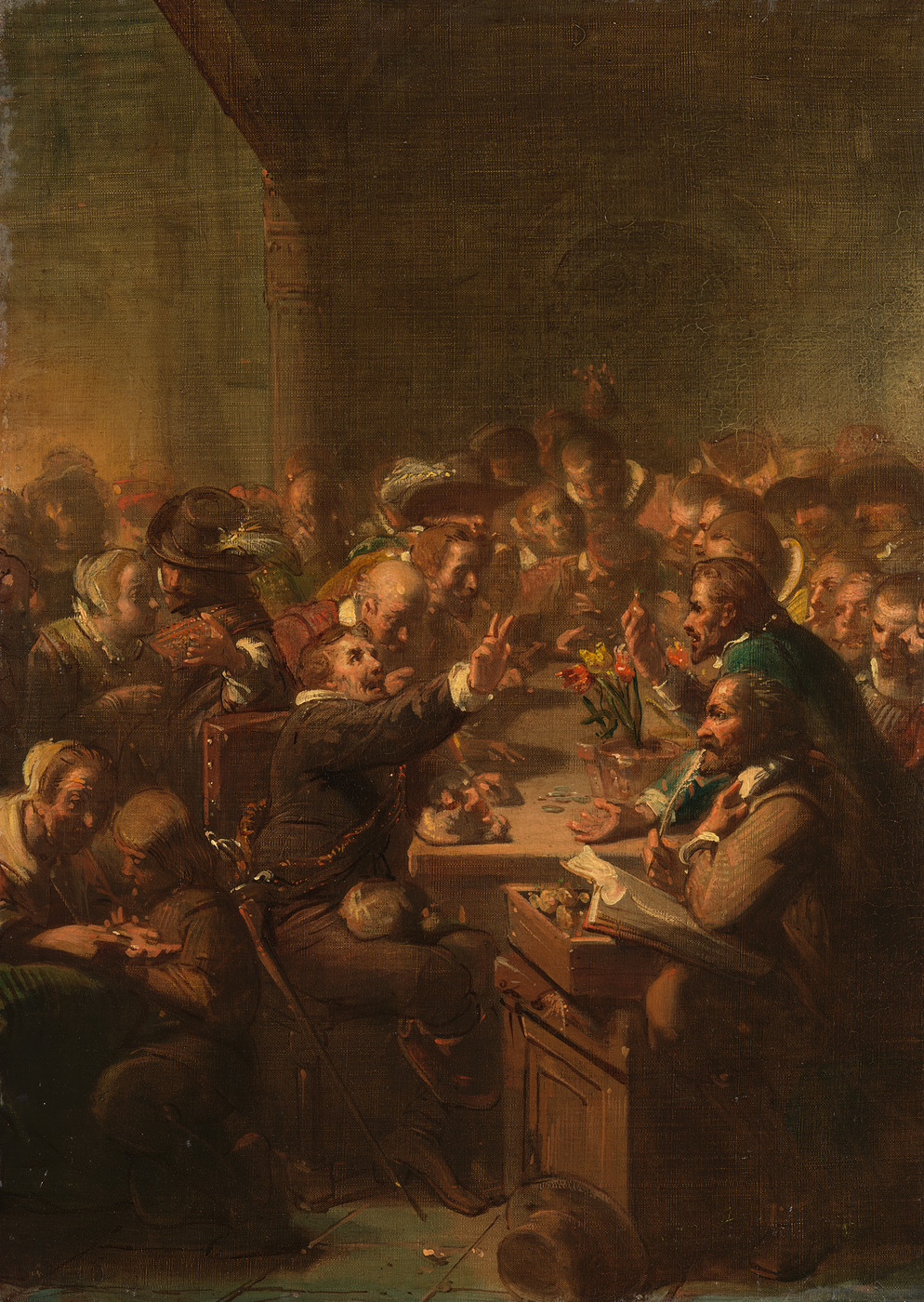
19th century painting depicting tulip mania, by Johannes Hinderikus Egenberger

The popularity of Mackay's tale has continued to this day, with new editions of Extraordinary Popular Delusions appearing regularly, with introductions by writers such as financier Bernard Baruch (1932), financial writer Andrew Tobias (1980), psychologist David J. Schneider (1993), and journalist Michael Lewis (2008).

Goldgar argues that although tulip mania may not have constituted an economic or speculative bubble, it was nonetheless traumatic to the Dutch for other reasons: "Even though the financial crisis affected very few, the shock of tulip mania was considerable. A whole network of values was thrown into doubt." The bubble in 1634 shows how people can get caught up in a financial craze even when something does not have real value. This is an example of the phenomenon called collective illusions. Here, the Dutch elite thought that having their own special tulip bulbs was a must, and this made the prices go up, even though tulips were not worth that much. In the 17th century, it was unimaginable to most people that something as common as a flower could be worth so much more money than most people earned in a year. The idea that the prices of flowers that grow only in the summer could fluctuate so wildly in the winter, threw into chaos the very understanding of "value".

Many of the sources telling of the woes of tulip mania, such as the anti-speculative pamphlets that were later reported by Beckmann and Mackay, have been cited as evidence of the extent of the economic damage. These pamphlets were not written by victims of a bubble but were primarily religiously motivated. The upheaval was viewed as a perversion of the moral order—proof that "concentration on the earthly, rather than the heavenly flower could have dire consequences".

Nearly a century later, during the crash of the Mississippi Company and the South Sea Company in about 1720, tulip mania appeared in satires of these manias. When Beckmann describes tulip mania in the 1780s, he compares it to the failing lotteries of the time. In Goldgar's view, even many modern popular works about financial markets, such as Burton Malkiel's A Random Walk Down Wall Street (1973), and John Kenneth Galbraith's A Short History of Financial Euphoria (1990; written soon after the crash of 1987), use the tulip mania as a lesson in morality.

Tulip mania became a popular reference during the dot-com bubble of 1995–2001 and the subprime mortgage crisis of 2007–2010. In 2013, Nout Wellink, former president of the De Nederlandsche Bank (Dutch Central Bank), described Bitcoin as "worse than the tulip mania", adding, "At least then you got a tulip, now you get nothing." Despite the mania's enduring popularity, Daniel Gross has said of economists offering efficient-market explanations for the mania, "If they're correct [...] then business writers will have to delete Tulipmania from their handy-pack of bubble analogies."

== Sources ==
- Dash, Mike (2011). Tulipomania: The Story of the World's Most Coveted Flower and the Extraordinary Passions It Aroused. New York: Three Rivers Press. ISBN 978-0-307-56082-7.
- De Vries, Jan (1976). The Economy of Europe in an Age of Crisis, 1600–1750. Cambridge University Press. ISBN 978-0-521-29050-0.
- French, Doug (2006). "The Dutch Monetary Environment during Tulipmania". The Quarterly Journal of Austrian Economics. 9 (1). Auburn, Alabama: Ludwig von Mises Institute: 3–14. doi:10.1007/s12113-006-1000-6. ISSN 1098-3708. S2CID 153904651. Archived from the original on December 19, 2022.
- Galbraith, John Kenneth (1994) [1990]. A Short History of Financial Euphoria (2nd ed.). Penguin Books. ISBN 978-0-670-85028-0. Archived from the original on March 28, 2023.
- Garber, Peter M. (1989). "Tulipmania". Journal of Political Economy. 97 (3). The University of Chicago Press: 535–560. doi:10.1086/261615. ISSN 0022-3808. JSTOR 1830454. S2CID 222435339. Archived from the original on December 19, 2022.
- Garber, Peter M. (1990), "Famous First Bubbles", The Journal of Economic Perspectives, 4 (2): 35–54, doi:10.1257/jep.4.2.35, JSTOR 1942889, S2CID 154443701
- Garber, Peter M. (2000), Famous First Bubbles: The Fundamentals of Early Manias, MIT Press, ISBN 978-0-262-07204-5
- Goldgar, Anne (2007). Tulipmania: Money, Honour, and Knowledge in the Dutch Golden Age. University of Chicago Press. ISBN 978-0-226-30125-9. Archived from the original on March 15, 2024.
- Krelage, E. H. (1942), Bloemenspeculatie in Nederland, Amsterdam: P. N. van Kampen & Zoon
- Kindleberger, Charles P.; Aliber, Robert (2005), Manias, Panics, and Crashes: A History of Financial Crises (5th ed.), Wiley, ISBN 978-0-471-46714-4
- Mackay, Charles (1841), Memoirs of Extraordinary Popular Delusions and the Madness of Crowds, London: Richard Bentley
- Malkiel, Burton G. (2007), A Random Walk Down Wall Street (9th ed.), W.W. Norton, ISBN 978-0-393-06245-8
- Nusteling, Hubert (1985). Welvaart en Werkgelegenheid in Amsterdam 1540–1860. Amsterdam: De Bataafsche Leeuw. ISBN 978-90670-7-082-9.
- Pavord, Anna (2014), The Tulip: The Story of a Flower That Has Made Men Mad, Bloomsbury Publishing, ISBN 978-1-4088-5903-2
- Schama, Simon (1997) [1987], The Embarrassment of Riches: An Interpretation of Dutch Culture in the Golden Age, Alfred Knopf, ISBN 978-0-394-51075-0
- Shiller, Robert J. (2005), Irrational Exuberance (2nd ed.), Princeton University Press, ISBN 978-0-691-12335-6
- Thompson, Earl A. (2007). "The Tulipmania: Fact or Artifact?" (PDF). Public Choice. 130 (1–2): 99–114. doi:10.1007/s11127-006-9074-4. S2CID 154546566. Archived (PDF) from the original on January 4, 2023.
