= Walter Morgan =

Walter Morgan may refer to:

- Sir Walter Morgan, 1st Baronet (1831–1916), British politician
- Walter L. Morgan (1898–1998), American businessman
- Walter Thomas James Morgan (1900–2003), British biochemist
- Walter Morgan (cricketer) (1871–1941), Australian cricketer
- Walter Morgan (golfer) (born 1941), American golfer
- Sir Walter Morgan (judge) (1821–1903), Chief Justice of the Madras High Court from 1871 to 1879
- Walter Morgan (priest) (died 1732), Welsh Anglican priest
