= The Little Book of Common Sense Investing =

Book by John C. Bogle

The Little Book of Common Sense Investing: The Only Way to Guarantee Your Fair Share of Stock Market Returns
- Author: John C. Bogle
- Language: English
- Genre: Investing
- Publisher: John Wiley & Sons
- Publication date: 2007
- Pages: 216 (1st ed) 307 (2nd ed)
- ISBN: 978-1-119-40450-7 1st edition's ISBN 978-0-470-10210-7
- OCLC: 76871376
- Dewey Decimal: 332.63/27 22
- LC Class: HG4530 .B635 2007

The Little Book of Common Sense Investing: The Only Way to Guarantee Your Fair Share of Stock Market Returns is a 2007 and 2017 book on index investing, by John C. Bogle, the founder and former CEO of the Vanguard Group. He focuses on index funds, which will give the investor the average market return, and on keeping investing costs low, so that the index fund investor will consistently do better than other investors after costs are considered. Trying to beat the market "is a loser's game," according to Bogle and "the more the managers and brokers take, the less investors make."

On October 16, 2017, a 2nd updated & revised 10th Anniversary Edition was published. The new edition features updated charts & data up until the year 2016, and a new introductory chapter.

== Overview ==
This is the sixth book by Bogle, and he writes that "the simplest and most efficient investment strategy is to buy and hold all of the nation’s publicly held businesses at very low cost." Bogle maintains that the "classic index fund" that owns this market portfolio is the only investment that guarantees a fair share of stock market returns. The book elaborates on the same practice of index investing that Bogle built the Vanguard Group around to turn a profit for clients.

1. Why Bogle thinks that business reality—dividend yields and earnings growth—is more important than market expectations.
2. How to overcome the impact of investment costs, taxes, and inflation.
3. How compounding returns are overwhelmed by the compounding costs.
4. What several investors and academics—from Warren Buffett and Benjamin Graham to Paul Samuelson and Burton Malkiel—have to say about index investing.

== Wiley series ==
This is the third book in Wiley's "Little Books. Big Profits" series. The series includes The Little Book That Beats the Market by Joel Greenblatt (Wiley, 2005), ISBN 978-0-471-73306-5 and The Little Book of Value Investing by Christopher H. Browne (Wiley, 2006), ISBN 978-0-470-05589-2

The series focus is to present finance strategies in general and understandable terms.

== Critical reception ==
In a 2016 New York Times column, Paul B. Brown wrote that Bogle "can be hectoring" and that "the idea of owning international stocks or bonds gets little attention," but that "in clear, convincing fashion he lays out a solid strategy for getting 'your fair share of stock market returns.'"

== Online ==
- Bogle, John C. (2007). The Little Book of Common Sense Investing: The Only Way to Guarantee Your Fair Share of Stock Market Returns. John Wiley and Sons. pp. 216. ISBN 9780470102107.

== See also ==
- Market Rules to Remember, by Bob Farrell
