= Common Sense on Mutual Funds =

1999 book by John C. Bogle

- Author: John Bogle
- Language: English
- Subject: Mutual funds
- Publication date: March 18, 1999
- Publication place: United States
- English publication date: John C. Wiley & Sons

Common Sense on Mutual Funds: New Imperatives for the Intelligent Investor, written by John Bogle, is a book educating investors about mutual funds, with a focus on the praise of index funds and the importance of having a long-term strategy. On the dust jacket cover, Jim Cramer wrote, "After a lifetime of picking stocks, I have to admit that (Vanguard Group founder John) Bogle's arguments in favor of the index fund have me thinking of joining him rather than trying to beat him."

Since its release, it has received high accolades in the investment community. It has become a bestseller and is considered a "classic". ConsumerAffairs.com rated it on its "15 Business Books That Could Actually Help Make You Rich" list.

Though it is aimed at American audiences, the British newspaper The Independent stated "there is nothing in it that does not apply in some measure to the UK fund industry."

== Editions ==
- Bogle, John C. (January 2010). Common Sense on Mutual Funds, Updated 10th Anniversary Edition. Wiley. p. 656. ISBN 978-0-470-59748-4.
- Bogle, John C. (1999). Common Sense on Mutual Funds: New Imperatives for the Intelligent Investor. Wiley. p. 496. ISBN 978-0-471-29543-3.

== See also ==
- Burton Malkiel's A Random Walk Down Wall Street
