= Salim Ramji (businessman) =

Chief executive officer of Vanguard

- Born: Tanzania
- Education: University of Toronto (BA); University of Cambridge (MA)
- Occupation: Financial services executive
- Title: Chief executive officer of The Vanguard Group
- Term: July 8, 2024–present
- Predecessor: Tim Buckley
- Board member of: The Vanguard Group

Salim Ramji is a financial services executive who has served as chief executive officer of Vanguard and a member of its board of directors since July 2024. He previously held senior leadership positions at BlackRock, including Global Head of iShares and Index Investments, and was a senior partner at McKinsey & Company.

== Early life and education ==
Ramji earned a bachelor's degree in economics and politics from the University of Toronto. He subsequently earned a Master of Arts degree in law from the University of Cambridge. He is a CFA charterholder.

== Career ==
=== Clifford Chance and McKinsey ===
Ramji began his career as a lawyer at Clifford Chance, working in London and Hong Kong. He subsequently joined McKinsey & Company, where he became a senior partner and led the firm's Asset & Wealth Management Practice.

=== BlackRock ===
Ramji joined BlackRock in 2014 as Global Head of Corporate Strategy. During his tenure, he also served as Head of U.S. Wealth Advisory and later as Global Head of iShares and Index Investments. As Global Head of iShares and Index Investments, Ramji was responsible for a majority of BlackRock's client assets. His responsibilities included the development of the iShares exchange-traded fund platform and BlackRock's index-investing business.

Ramji was also a member of BlackRock's Global Executive Committee. He left the firm in January 2024.

=== Vanguard ===
On May 14, 2024, Vanguard announced that its board had appointed Ramji as the company's next chief executive officer and a member of its board of directors. He assumed the position on July 8, 2024, succeeding Tim Buckley, who retired as chairman and chief executive officer. His appointment made him the first external executive selected to lead Vanguard since its founding.

As CEO, Ramji leads Vanguard's investment, advice and retirement businesses. Vanguard's official biography states that the company serves more than 50 million individual investors worldwide and employs approximately 20,000 people.

In September 2024, Ramji said Vanguard planned to expand its fixed-income offering, citing opportunities to apply the company's low-cost investment approach more extensively to bond markets. He also indicated that Vanguard was exploring opportunities involving private markets and potential partnerships.

== See also ==
- The Vanguard Group
- BlackRock
- iShares
- Index fund
- Exchange-traded fund
