= Primecap =

Asset management firm based in Pasadena, California

PRIMECAP Management Company
- Type: Private
- Industry: Investment management
- Founded: September 15, 1983; 42 years ago
- Founders: Howard Schow; Mitchell Milias; Theo Kolokotrones
- Headquarters: Pasadena, California, U.S.
- Key people: Alfred Mordecai (President); Theo Kolokotrones (Chairman Emeritus); Joel Fried (Chairman)
- AUM: US$134 billion (July 2024)
- Number of employees: 40 (July 2024)
- Website: www.primecap.com

PRIMECAP Management Company (Primecap) is an American investment management firm based in Pasadena, California. The firm is known for managing US-focused equity portfolios for The Vanguard Group (Vanguard). In 2004, it launched its own mutual funds, the Odyssey Funds. In addition, it also handles separately managed accounts for institutional investors.

Despite its strong investment performance and large number of assets under management (AUM), the firm keeps a low profile.

== Background ==
Primecap was founded On September 15, 1983, by Howard Schow, Mitchell Milias and Theo Kolokotrones. The three of them previously worked at the Capital Group Companies where Schow was chairman of its investment committee as well as Capital Research and Management Company. A dispute between Schow and Jon B. Lovelace Jr. (the company's chief and son of founder Jonathan Bell Lovelace) eventually led to Schow leaving to found Primecap with Milias and Kolokotrones where they opened an office just 20 minutes away from the headquarters of the Capital Group.

In 1984, John C. Bogle, the founder and chief of Vanguard met with management team of Primecap to discuss a deal to set up a fund together. According to Bogle, Primecap was selected as it met the "four Ps": People, philosophy, Portfolio and Performance. It was reported that initially Primecap rejected Bogle's offer. On November 1, 1984, Primecap and Vanguard launched the Vanguard Primecap fund with $100,000 in seed money from Bogle himself. While the fund was owned by Vanguard, it would be managed by Primecap. In 2015 it was reported that a $10,000 investment in the Vanguard Primecap fund would be worth nearly $500,000 that year which would be almost double the return of the S&P 500 index. The annualized average return was 13.7%.

In a rare interview with Forbes in 1994, Schow said the firm does not go for 20% or 30% gains but rather for triples, quadruples, octuples which takes years to obtain.

In 1998, Primecap briefly put itself up for sale but the bids were too low and there were concerns that Vanguard would pull out its assets if Primecap was sold to a rival.

In 2004, Primecap launched its own mutual funds, the Odyssey Funds, which would be three different funds. They paid homage to Kolokotrones’ Greek ancestry and were referencing the Odyssey, the Greek epic poem featuring the legendary warrior Odysseus who was known for his cunningness and patience. This was in line with Primecap's strategy of being patient to obtain superior long-term results. There was some speculation there was a spat between Primecap and Vanguard and this was done to reduce dependency on Vanguard.

Regarding Primecap's performance, the Vanguard Primecap fund had a return of 621% in the 1990s compared to the S&P 500 index of 432%. In 2000 after the Dot-com bubble, the firm returned 18% while many other funds suffered significant losses. In 2004, the Vanguard Primecap fund had a return of 300% in the last 10 years compared to the S&P 500 index of 186%. During the 2008 financial crisis, Primecap funds held up far better than other growth funds. In 2014, all Primecap managed funds landed in the top 20% of their peer groups over the past five years. In 2016, it was reported that all six of the mutual funds managed by Primecap beat 86% of its peers over the past decade. Throughout its history, Primecap has closed its funds to new investors and resisted broadening its lineup.

At the end of 2022, 80% of Primecap's assets were with its three Vanguard funds and has held around this proportion throughout its history. The Vanguard Primecap fund is its flagship fund and stocks stay in the fund for an average of 20 years. Primecap is Vanguard's second largest relationship after Wellington Management Company and in 2015, it took in $148 million in fees from Vanguard. It is reported that Primecap charges only 0.5% in management fees which is around half the industry average.

Apart from Vanguard, other institutional clients of the firm include General Motors, Caterpillar Inc., Hewlett-Packard and the Metropolitan Museum of Art. However the number of institutional clients it manages money for is considered quite limited with only 25 as reported in 2012.

Regarding its original founders, in 2012, Schow died and in 2014, Milias stepped down from portfolio-management duties. Kolokotrones remains at the firm serving as its chairman emeritus and a portfolio manager. The president of firm is Alfred Mordecai, who joined in 1997. Joel Fried serves as the chairman and joined in 1986 and tends to be more conservative while investing in sectors Kolokotrones does not invest in.

The firm is small in size with 35 employees in 2016. Each analyst was chosen by the principals of the firm. Each year Fried, Kolokotrones or other principals would go to top business schools to hire. Once hired its employees are given a few months to learn and make stock recommendations with little guidance in a sink or swim approach. The analysts follow Schow's dicta of finding stocks with superior prospects based on new products, markets, management or some kind of structural shift in demand or supply then once they are bought, they shall be held onto for a long period. It isn't uncommon for analysts to meet with a company 8-10 times before actually investing. Primecap avoids groupthink by allowing each portfolio manager to run his own portion of each portfolio independently.

Primecap focuses almost entirely on research and portfolio management with little regard to sales and marketing. The firm tends to avoid media interviews as it does not see it helping achieve superior returns. In addition, the firm does not want to become too big with regards to AUM as it would limit the universe of investable stocks making its portfolio look like a stock market index which it is trying to outperform.
