= Mark Loughridge =

American businessman (born 1953)

Mark Loughridge (born December 19, 1953) is an American businessman who was IBM's senior vice president and chief financial officer, finance and enterprise transformation. He stands as longest-tenured CFO after nearly 10 years in the role.

He joined the company in 1977, where he started as a development engineer in the Office Products Division in Lexington, Kentucky. He was also financial services manager for IBM's lab in Hursley, England. He held a number of senior positions including Vice President and IBM Controller; Vice President of Finance and Planning for IBM Global Services; Vice President of Finance for Sales and Distribution; Vice President of Finance for the IBM Personal Systems Group, and Senior Vice President and General Manager of IBM Global Financing before being named CFO in May 2004. In July 2010, he also took on the Enterprise Transformation role to lead IBM's integration and transformation.

Loughridge joined the board of The Vanguard Group in 2012 and became chairman in July 2024.

== Education ==
He holds a Master of Business Administration degree from the University of Chicago Booth School of Business, a bachelor's degree in mechanical engineering from Stanford University and completed studies at Ecole Nationale Superieure de Mecanique in Nantes, France.

== Awards ==
In 2010 and 2013, Loughridge was rated by the buy-side analysts as the top rated CFO in the IT Hardware Sector by Institutional Investor. In 2012, he was ranked the #1 CFO in America by The Wall Street Journal, and named the "Executive Dream Team" CFO by Fortune Magazine, and the "Best CFO" in the IT hardware category by Institutional Investor.
