= The Tulip Folly =

1882 painting by Jean-Léon Gérôme

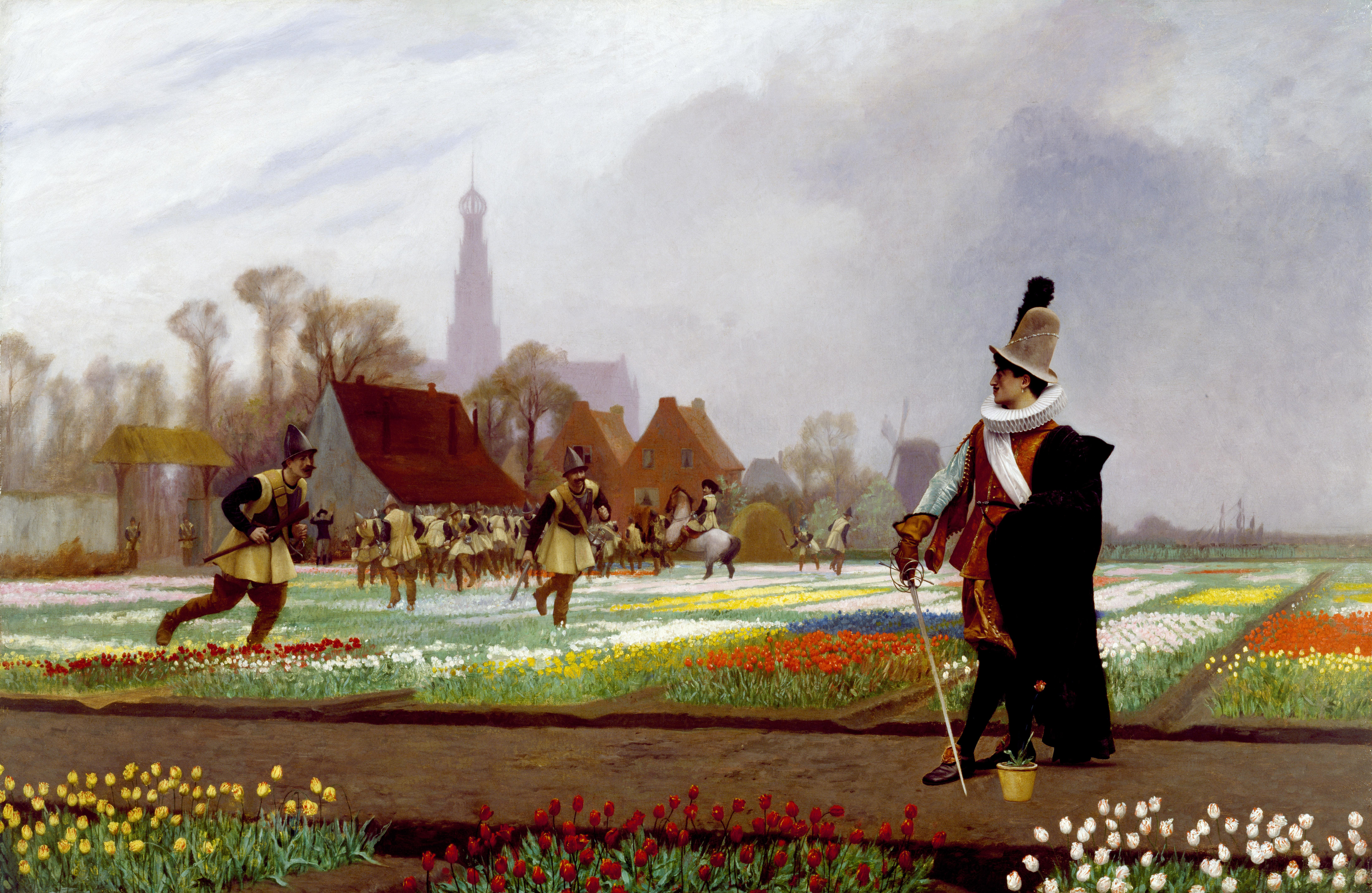
- Artist: Jean-Léon Gérôme
- Year: 1882
- Medium: Oil on canvas
- Dimensions: 65.4 cm × 100 cm (25.7 in × 39 in)
- Location: Walters Museum of Art

The Tulip Folly is an 1882 painting by French artist Jean-Léon Gérôme. Done in oil on canvas, the painting demonstrates a conceptual scene from the historical "tulip mania" of 17th century Holland. The work is in the collection of the Walters Museum of Art.

"The tulip, originally imported from Turkey in the 16th century, became an increasingly valuable commodity. By 1636/7, tulipomania peaked, and, when the market crashed, speculators were left with as little as 5 percent of their original investments."

During the tulipmania of the 1630s, as variegated tulips continued to demand outrageous prices, more growers were encouraged to enter a market already flooded with solid-colored flowers. In…The Tulip Folly by Jean-Léon Gérôme, a broken tulip is defended by its aristocratic owner from government soldiers (the silhouette of Haarlem's St. Bavo church can be seen in the background). They are trampling the surrounding flower beds in an attempt to limit the supply of tulips and so keep prices from dropping even lower. The picture, too, was seen as the connoisseur defending beauty for its own sake. This is how it was perceived by Mary Jane Morgan, the widow of a wealthy shipping magnate, who was the first to own the picture. In 1886, a year after her death, it sold at auction for $6,000. Painted in 1882, The Tulip Folly was a commentary as well on the crash that year of the Paris bourse (stock exchange). It was to be the worst financial crisis in France in the nineteenth century and inaugurated a recession that lasted until the end of the decade.
