= John J. Brennan (businessman) =

American businessperson and board member

John J. Brennan (born 1954), also known as Jack Brennan, served as Chairman of The Vanguard Group from 1996 to 2009, and was Vanguard CEO from 1996 to 2008, when he was succeeded by William McNabb.

== Career ==
Brennan joined Vanguard in 1982. For many years he served as the company's president alongside John C. Bogle who was Vanguard's founder and CEO. When Bogle stepped down from his chairmanship in 1996, Brennan was his hand-picked successor.

He also was chairman of the Investment Company Institute, a trade organization representing mutual fund companies. He has chaired the Board of Trustees of the University of Notre Dame. He was an independent director of General Electric and was also the chairman of FINRA (Financial Industry Regulatory Authority). He has also acted as director of Guardian Life Insurance Company of America, American Express Company, and Rockefeller Capital Management; as chairman of the board of trustees of the University of Notre Dame; and a founding trustee of King Abdullah University of Science and Technology (KAUST).

== Personal life ==
Brennan grew up in Winchester, Massachusetts, and attended Dartmouth College where he was a member of Sigma Nu fraternity. Brennan's father, Frank Brennan, was chief executive at Union Warren Savings Bank in Boston. Brennan was raised Catholic and remains a devout Catholic.
