= A Random Walk Down Wall Street =

1973 book by Burton Malkiel

- Author: Burton Malkiel
- Language: English
- Genre: Non-fiction
- Publisher: W. W. Norton & Company, Inc.
- Publication date: 1973
- Publication place: United States
- Pages: 456 pp.
- ISBN: 0-393-06245-7
- OCLC: 72798896
- Dewey Decimal: 332.6 22
- LC Class: HG4521 .M284 2007

A Random Walk Down Wall Street, written by Burton Gordon Malkiel, a Princeton University economist, is a book on the subject of stock markets which popularized the random walk hypothesis. Published in 1973, Malkiel argues that asset prices typically exhibit signs of a random walk, and thus one cannot consistently outperform market averages. The book is frequently cited by those in favor of the efficient-market hypothesis. After the twelfth edition, over 1.5 million copies had been sold, with the thirteenth edition being released in 2023 to coincide with the fiftieth anniversary of the original release. A practical popularization is The Random Walk Guide to Investing: Ten Rules for Financial Success.

== Investing techniques ==
Malkiel examines some popular investing techniques, including technical analysis and fundamental analysis, in light of academic research studies of these methods. Through detailed analysis, he notes significant flaws in both techniques, concluding that, for most investors, following these methods will produce inferior results compared to passive strategies.

Malkiel has a similar critique for methods of selecting actively managed mutual funds based upon past performances. He cites studies indicating that actively managed mutual funds vary greatly in their success rates over the long term, often underperforming in years following their successes, thereby regressing toward the mean. Malkiel suggests that given the distribution of fund performances, it is statistically unlikely that an average investor would happen to select those few mutual funds which will outperform their benchmark index over the long term.

== See also ==
- Common Sense on Mutual Funds, by John C. Bogle
