= Walter L. Morgan =

American businessman

Walter L. Morgan (July 23, 1898 – September 2, 1998) was the founder of the Wellington Fund, the first balanced mutual fund in the United States and one of the oldest surviving mutual funds. Morgan was born in Wilkes-Barre, Pennsylvania, where he prepared at The Hillman Academy. He graduated from Princeton University in 1920, and shortly thereafter became the youngest CPA in Pennsylvania.

In the 1920s, Morgan raised $100,000 from relatives and business people to create what he believed to be a stable investment portfolio. The Industrial and Power Securities Company was established in 1928. It was later renamed The Wellington Fund in honour of the Duke of Wellington. Wellington Management Company was incorporated in Philadelphia in 1933. In 1951, Morgan hired John C. Bogle (who later founded Vanguard) to become his heir at the company.
