= Market Rules to Remember =

Bob Farrell's 10 rules of investing

Market Rules to Remember is a list of ten cautionary rules for investors that was written in 1998 by the then-retired Chief Market Analyst at Merrill Lynch, Bob Farrell. The rules became iconic on Wall Street and are frequently reprinted in leading financial advisory publications.

== Background ==
In 1955, Robert "Bob" J. Farrell graduated from Columbia University with a master's in investment finance, where his teachers included Benjamin Graham. After 2 years of service in the US Army, Farrell joined Merrill Lynch in 1957. By 1967, was made Chief Market Analyst (CMA) at Merrill, a title he held for over 25 years until stepping down in 1992, then aged 60. For the 16 of his last 17 years as CMA at Merrill Lynch, Institutional Investor voted Farrell as America's best analyst in forecasting equity market direction, and he was inducted into the "Hall of Fame". Farrell is considered a pioneer of technical analysis, and he is noted as being the first to incorporate "sentiment analysis" into financial forecasting. In 1970, he was made the first president of what became the CMT Association.

After stepping down as CMA, Farrell stayed with Merrill as a senior investment officer writing regular reports for clients. In September 1998, as the dot-com bubble was nearing its peak, Farrell published a list of ten "Market Rules to Remember" on the back of one of his reports. The rules received little attention when they were first published, and Farrell retired fully in 2002 after 45 years with the firm. Merrill Lynch chief North American economist David Rosenberg re-published the rules in 2003, after the dot-com bubble burst, and they have been quoted by financial advisors ever since.

== Rules ==
In 1998, Farrell laid out his "Market Rules to Remember" as follows:

- Rule #1. "Markets tend to return to the mean over time".
- Rule #2. "Excesses in one direction will lead to an opposite excess in the other direction".
- Rule #3. "There are no new eras — excesses are never permanent".
- Rule #4. "Exponential rapidly rising or falling markets usually go further than you think, but they do not correct by going sideways".
- Rule #5. "The public buys the most at the top and the least at the bottom".
- Rule #6. "Fear and greed are stronger than long-term resolve".
- Rule #7. "Markets are strongest when they are broad, and weakest when they narrow to a handful of blue-chip names".
- Rule #8. "Bear markets have three stages — sharp down, reflexive rebound, and a drawn-out fundamental downtrend".
- Rule #9. "When all the experts and forecasts agree — something else is going to happen".
- Rule #10. "Bull markets are more fun than bear markets".

== Legacy ==
In 2020, CNBC said: "Some would say Farrell was immortalized by his rules of investing that remains widely quoted today". In 2021, Morgan Stanley said to their clients about Farrell's rules: "... they are pinned to the wall or taped to the screen of market professionals all over the world. A Google search of “10 Market Rules to Remember” reveals 305 million results. They are timeless". In 2022, Bank of America wrote to their clients saying: "You can't change human nature and Mr. Farrell's rules seem as relevant today as when he retired from Merrill Lynch 20 years ago". Farrell's rules are not only used on Wall Street, in 2020, India's The Economic Times said: "Although Farrell retired long back, his years of wisdom summarized in his famous book, titled 10 Market Rules to Remember, has lived on and is always referred to when investors get into difficult market situations".

== See also ==
- The Intelligent Investor
- The Little Book of Common Sense Investing
