= Nancy Weiss Malkiel =

American historian

- Born: Nancy Joan Weiss; 1944 (age 81–82)
- Spouse: Burton Malkiel (m. 1988)

Academic background
- Education: Smith College (BA); Harvard University (MA, PhD)
- Thesis: "Not alms, but opportunity": a history of the National Urban League, 1910-1940. (1970)

Academic work
- Institutions: Princeton University

Nancy Joan Weiss Malkiel (née Weiss; born 1944) is an American historian. She became the first woman to join Princeton University's Department of History and served as Princeton's Dean of the college for 24 years. Weiss Malkiel holds the title of Professor of History Emerita upon her retirement.

== Early life and education ==
Weiss Malkiel earned her Bachelor of Arts degree from Smith College where she received a Woodrow Wilson Fellowship to Harvard University for her Master's degree and PhD.

== Career ==
While completing her PhD in 1969, Weiss Malkiel became the first woman to join Princeton University's Department of History faculty. After four years, she was recommended for tenure in November 1975, becoming the first woman in six years to be put up for a promotion. However, after a negative departmental vote she was denied the promotion and as a result, history department chairman Richard D. Challener resigned in protest. Following his resignation, the board re-voted on December 1 and moved to promote Weiss Malkiel to a tenured position. She was shortly promoted to Full professor in 1982, which she maintained until her retirement. As a fully tenured professor, she served as the founding master of Dean Mathey College from 1982 until 1986.

After spending the 1986–87 academic year on a fellowship at the Center for Advanced Study in the Behavioral Sciences at Stanford University, Weiss Malkiel returned to Princeton as the Dean of Princeton's Undergraduate College. In this role, she developed the McGraw Center for Teaching and Learning and launched the college's new four-year college system. In 1996, Weiss Malkiel co-inaugurated a program of Presidential Teaching Initiatives which was funded by alumni Harold McGraw Jr. in 1998 "to endow a center for promoting innovative teaching and effective learning throughout the University." Later, the four-year college system was established in 2002 with Weiss Malkiel and Janet Dickerson as its leaders in order to "create more interaction for first- and second-year students with upperclass students, graduate students and faculty."

In 2004, Weiss Malkiel implemented a grade deflation policy to curb the number of A-range grades undergraduates received. Malkiel's argument was that an A was beginning to lose its meaning as a larger percentage of the student body received them. While the number of A's has indeed decreased under the policy, many argue that this is hurting Princeton students when they apply to jobs or graduate school. Malkiel has said that she sent pamphlets to inform institutions about the policy so that they consider Princeton students equally, but students argue that Princeton graduates can apply to other institutions that know nothing about it. They argue further that as other schools purposefully inflate their grades, Princeton students' GPAs will look low by comparison. Further, studies have shown that employers prefer high grades even when they are inflated. The policy remained in place even after Malkiel stepped down at the end of the 2010–2011 academic term.

Weiss Malkiel stepped down from her role as Dean of Princeton's Undergraduate College in 2010 and officially became a Professor of History Emerita upon her retirement in 2016. Following her retirement, she published a book titled ''"Keep the Damned Women Out": The Struggle for Coeducation, and was elected a fellow of the American Philosophical Society in 2019.

== Personal life ==
Weiss Malkiel married her husband Burton Malkiel on August 1, 1988.

== Selected publications ==
The following is a list of selected publications:

- "Keep the Damned Women Out": The Struggle for Coeducation (2016)
- Whitney M. Young, Jr., and the Struggle for Civil Rights (1989)
- Farewell to the Party of Lincoln: Black Politics in the Age of FDR (1983)
- The National Urban League, 1910-1940 (1974)
