= Mortimer J. Buckley =

American business executive (born 1969)

Tim Buckley
- Born: Mortimer Joseph Buckley; April 26, 1969 (age 56); Boston, Massachusetts, U.S.
- Education: Harvard University (BA, MBA)
- Known for: Former CEO of The Vanguard Group
- Predecessor: William McNabb
- Successor: Salim Ramji
- Children: 3

Mortimer Joseph "Tim" Buckley (born April 26, 1969) is an American business executive who was the chief executive officer of The Vanguard Group between 2018 and 2024.

== Early life and education ==
Buckley was born on April 26, 1969, to Mortimer John Buckley and Marilyn (née Scully) Buckley. His father, the Chief of the Massachusetts General Hospital Cardiac Surgical Unit, was a devout Catholic from an Irish immigrant family who raised his children in the Catholic faith.

Buckley attended secondary school at the Belmont Hill School in Belmont, Massachusetts. In 1991, he earned a BA degree in economics from Harvard College. In 1996, he earned an MBA degree from Harvard Business School.

== Career ==
In 1991, Buckley joined Vanguard as an assistant to company founder John C. Bogle. From 2001 to 2006, Buckley was Chief Information Officer, and from 2006 to 2012, he was head of the Retail Investor Group. He became Chief Investment Officer when Gus Sauter retired in 2013.

In 2017, Vanguard's Board of Directors unanimously elected Buckley to succeed F. William McNabb III as Chief Executive Officer, effective January 2018.

In February 2024, it was announced that Buckley would step down as CEO by the end of 2024, ending a 33-year career at Vanguard. He was succeeded by Salim Ramji in July 2024.

== Personal life ==
Buckley is married and has three children. He lives in Wayne, Pennsylvania.
