= Wellington Fund =

First balanced mutual fund in the US

The Wellington Fund was the first balanced mutual fund in the United States, and is one of the oldest surviving mutual funds. It was established in 1928 by Walter L. Morgan with $100,000 raised from relatives and business people in Morgan's home state of Pennsylvania. It was originally called the Industrial and Power Securities Company, but was later renamed after the Duke of Wellington. Wellington Management Company was incorporated in 1933, and while it still manages the Wellington Fund, it is a private firm, independent of Vanguard which offers and administers the fund.

== See also ==
- The Vanguard Group
- Walter L. Morgan
- Wellington Management Company
