= Wellington Management Company =

American investment management firm

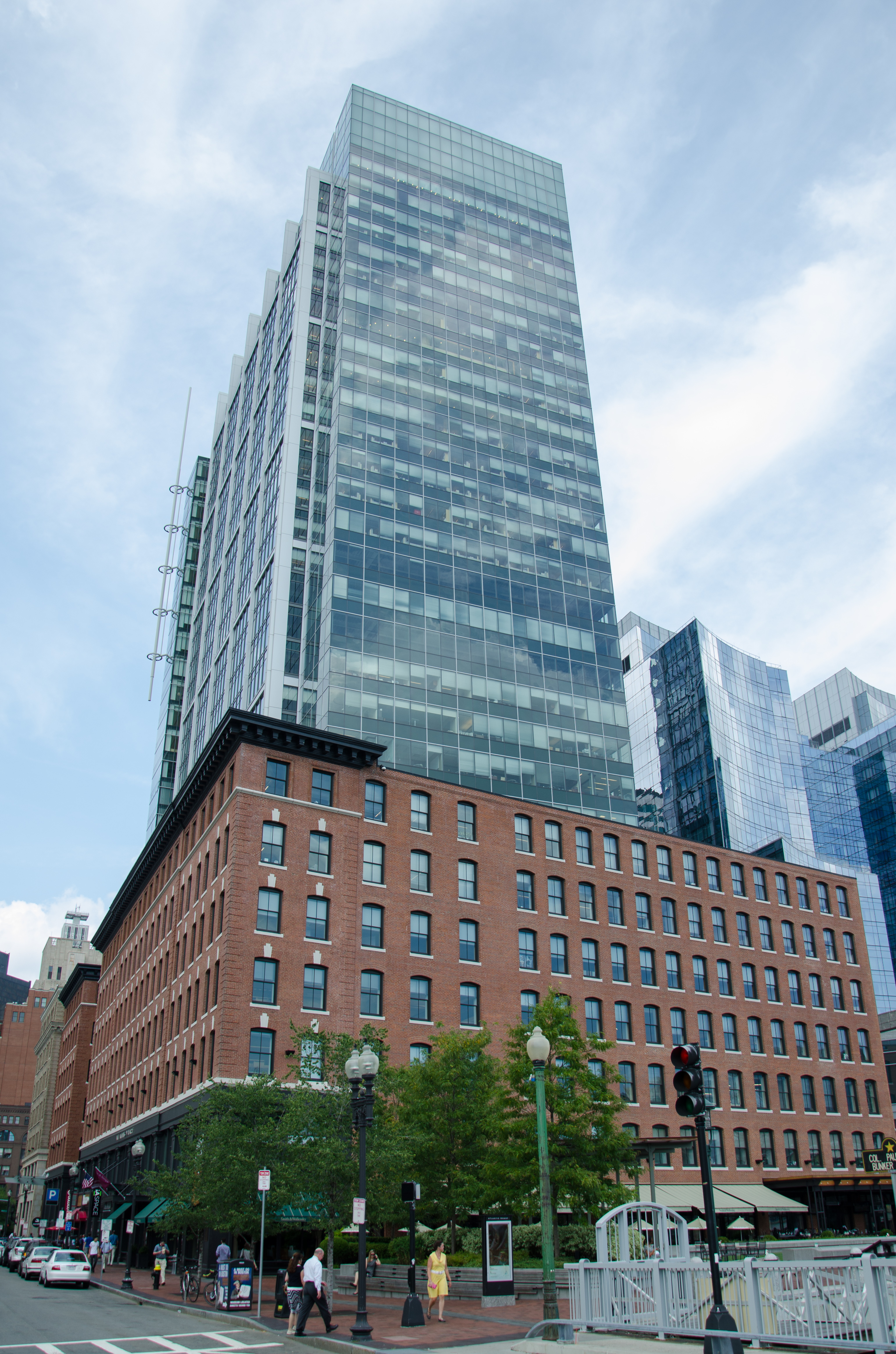
- Headquarters at Atlantic Wharf
- Type: Private
- Industry: Investment management
- Founded: 1933; 93 years ago in Philadelphia, Pennsylvania, US
- Founder: Walter L. Morgan
- Headquarters: Atlantic Wharf, Boston, US
- Key people: Jean Hynes (CEO)
- Products: Investment management Mutual funds
- AUM: ▲US$1.4 trillion (2022)
- Number of employees: 1,922 (2022)
- Website: www.wellington.com

Wellington Management Company is an American private, independent investment management firm with client assets under management totaling over US$1 trillion based in Boston, Massachusetts, United States.

The firm serves as an investment advisor to over 2,200 institutions in over 60 countries, as of 30 June 2020. Its clients include central banks and sovereign institutions, pension funds, endowments and foundations, family offices, fund sponsors, insurance companies, financial intermediaries, and wealth managers.

== History ==
In 1928, Philadelphia-based accountant Walter L. Morgan established the first balanced mutual fund in the United States, the Wellington Fund. Wellington Management Company was incorporated in 1933.

In 1951, the firm hired John C. Bogle, who succeeded Morgan as chairman in 1970. In 1967, Wellington merged with Boston-based investment management firm Thorndike, Doran, Paine & Lewis. Bogle left in 1974 and established The Vanguard Group, retaining Wellington to manage some of Vanguard's funds.

In 1979, Wellington's 29 original partners bought back the firm after a period as a public company.

In 1994, Wellington offered its first Luxembourg-domiciled UCITS fund.

Also in 1994, Wellington offered its first hedge fund. Today, the firm manages alternatives assets for clients totaling over US$40 billion and offers over 40 funds.

In 2014, the firm offered its first dedicated private equity strategy.

Brendan Swords became chief executive officer in 2014, succeeding Perry Traquina. In September 2020 the firm announced that Swords would retire on June 30, 2021, and that managing partner Jean Hynes would succeed him as CEO. Hynes took over in 2021 and is the first woman to lead the firm.

== The Wellington Management Foundation ==
The Wellington Management Foundation, a charitable fund with an educational focus, was founded in 1992. Through its annual grant-making program, the Foundation currently supports programs and organizations in nine regions, including Philadelphia, that improve the education and educational opportunities of economically disadvantaged youth. The Wellington Management UK Foundation was established in 2016 to make grants to organizations in the UK and Europe.

== Offices ==
Headquartered in Boston, the company has an office in Radnor, Pennsylvania, and opened offices in London in 1983; Singapore in 1996; San Francisco, Sydney, and Tokyo in 1997, Hong Kong in 2003; Chicago in 2004; Beijing in 2007; Frankfurt in 2011; Zürich and Luxembourg in 2014; Toronto in 2018; Shanghai in 2020; Milan in 2021; Madrid in 2022, New York and Dubai in 2023.

== Industry awards ==
In 2013 and 2014 Wellington's Retirement and Pension plan was named one of the best 401K plans by BrightScope.

Wellington Management was named one of the leading Pan-European fund management firms in the 2014 Thomson Reuters Extel awards.

In 2016, Citywire ranked Jean Hynes one of the top 20 female portfolio managers in the United States.

Wellington ranked #9 in Institutional Investor's 2017 annual ranking of AUM of top money managers headquartered in the US. In 2016 it ranked #1 asset manager by brand awareness scores by eVestment survey.

In 2018, Wellington's Global Director of Diversity and Inclusion, Shawna Ferguson, won the Northeast Human Resources Association Individual Diversity Champion of the Year Award. and the firm's Private Equity Investor, Matt Witheiler, was named to the Midas Brink List.

Jean Hynes was listed among Barron's "100 Most Influential Women in U.S. Finance" in March 2020.

The firm was awarded the Fixed Income Manager of the Year award for 2020 by Environmental Finance.
