= Walter Morgan (priest) =

Walter Morgan was a Welsh Anglican priest.

Morgan was educated at Jesus College, Oxford. He was Archdeacon of St Davids from 10 February 1731 until his death on 28 February 1732.
