= Robert D. Arnott =

American investor and writer (born 1954)

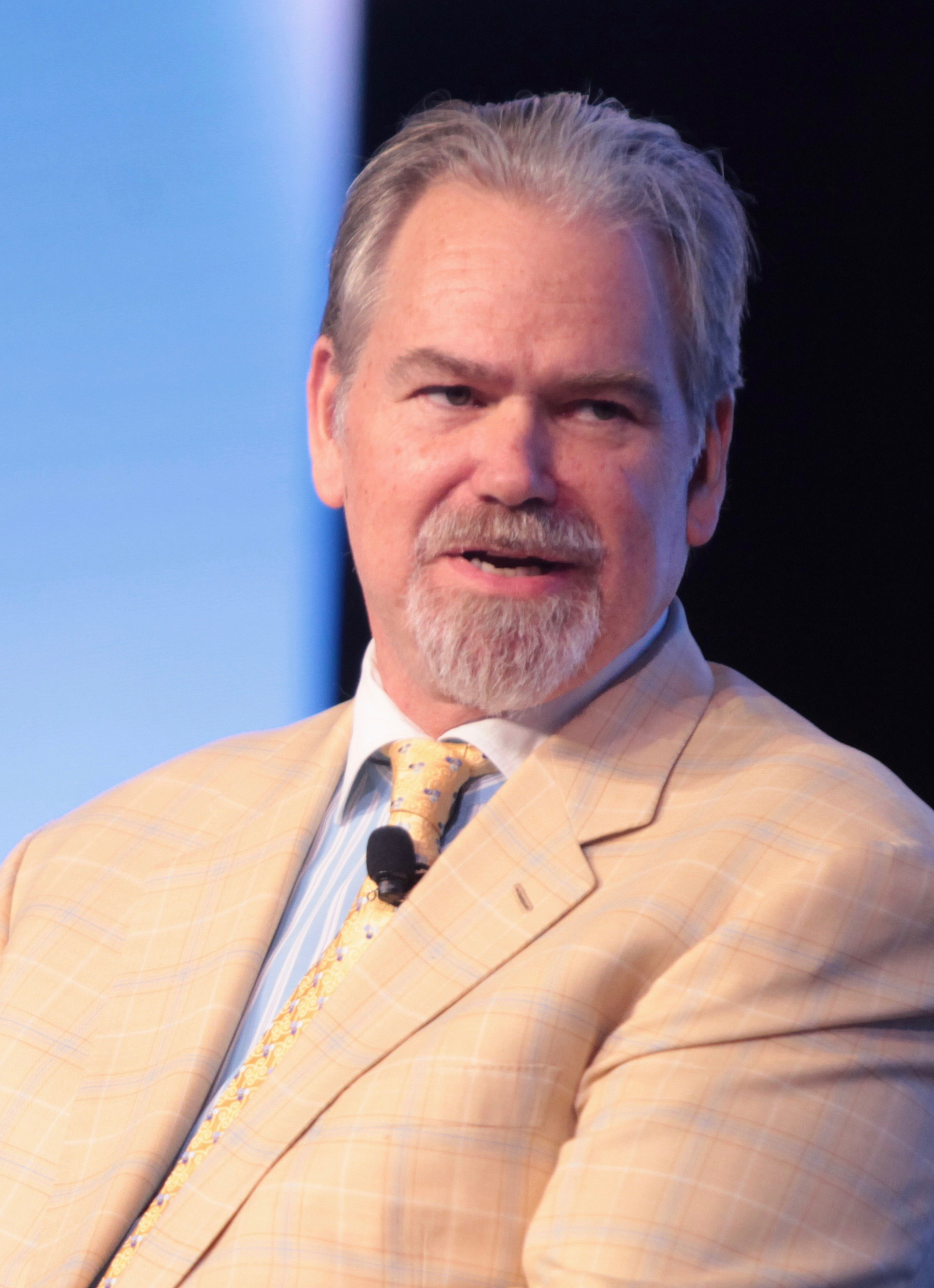
- Arnott in 2016
- Born: June 29, 1954 (age 72); Chicago, Illinois, US
- Education: University of California, Santa Barbara (BS)
- Scientific career
- Fields: Business, Finance, Investments
- Workplaces: Research Affiliates (2002–2026); Syzygy Asset Management (2026–present)

Robert D. Arnott (born June 29, 1954) is an American investor, researcher, and writer known for his work in quantitative investing and fundamental indexing strategies.

He founded Research Affiliates in 2002 and in August 2026 sold Research Affiliates' RAFI Indices unit to TMX Group. He is now Chairman of Syzygy Asset Management, the investment firm relaunched in August 2026, following the carve-out sale. Syzygy has approximately US$30 billion in assets under management. Arnott has authored over 150 academic publications and is often referred to as the "godfather of smart beta" for his influence on new, systematic approaches to index-based portfolio construction.)

== Early life and education ==
Arnott was born in 1954 and raised in the United States. As a high school student in 1970, he attended the Summer Science Program. He later studied at the University of California, Santa Barbara, graduating summa cum laude in 1977, with a Bachelor of Science degree in economics, applied mathematics, and computer science.

In college, Arnott contemplated a career in either astrophysics or finance. He opted for finance after deciding his math skills were inadequate for making serious contributions to science, but above average for finance or investing, as he later recalled, "where hardly anyone was using serious math at the time.”

== Career ==
Arnott began his career in finance after graduating from the University of California, Santa Barbara. He has held positions at firms including Global Equity Strategist at Salomon Brothers (now a part of Citigroup), president of The Boston Company, and TSA Capital Management (later TSA/Analytic). In 1998, he became the chairman of First Quadrant LP, an investment management firm.

In 2002, he founded Research Affiliates, based in Newport Beach, California. The firm developed investment strategies, partnering with companies such as Charles Schwab, Invesco, and PIMCO to deliver investment products. As of July 2025, more than $180 billion in global assets were managed using investment strategies developed by Research Affiliates.

From 2004, the firm was involved in the research and development of fundamentally based indexes. In November 2009, Research Affiliates was awarded a patent for its index methodology that selects and weights securities using fundamental measures of company size. Its index business was held in a subsidiary, RAFI Indices, which expanded into multiple-asset strategies in 2024.

Arnott is co-manager of the PIMCO All Asset Fund, a diversified, tactical fund of funds with $16 billion in assets as of March 2022, which can invest in any of PIMCO's many mutual funds. This fund is intended to feature what Arnott calls "Third Pillar" options, meant to diversify beyond traditional stocks and investment-grade bonds, and may include master limited partnerships, high-yield bonds, emerging markets debt, or liquid alternatives with the goal of boosting long-term portfolio performance.

In 2025, he received the ETF.com Lifetime Achievement Award for his contributions to the field of exchange-traded funds and index investing.

In June 2026, TMX Group agreed to acquire RAFI Indices, the index subsidiary of Research Affiliates Global Holdings, for US$490 million, placing it within the company's TMX VettaFi unit. The transaction closed on August 18, 2026, and Research Affiliates' remaining investment-management business was relaunched as Syzygy Asset Management the same day, with Arnott as chairman. The new business focus was announced on September 10, 2026. Syzygy manages approximately US$30 billion and maintains sub-advisory relationships with PIMCO and Russell Investments. According to chief investment officer, Jim Masturzo, the sale included the rights to the Research Affiliates name.

== Research and Publications ==
Arnott has published over 150 academic papers in refereed journals. Topics of these papers have included the following: mutual fund returns, the equity risk premium, tactical asset allocation, and alternative index investing. He was the editor of the CFA Institute's Financial Analysts Journal from 2002 to 2006, and has edited three books on equity management and tactical asset allocation. Arnott is a co-author of the book The Fundamental Index: A Better Way to Invest, which outlines the theoretical and practical aspects of fundamental index investing, written alongside Jason Hsu and John West. Arnott is also the co-editor of three other books relating to asset allocation and equity market investing.

== Academic and Professional Involvement ==
Arnott has served as a Visiting Professor of Finance at the UCLA Anderson School of Management, on the editorial board of the Journal of Portfolio Management, the product advisory board of the Chicago Mercantile Exchange, and the Chicago Board Options Exchange.

He has received seven Graham and Dodd Scrolls and Awards from the CFA Institute for best articles of the year, and has received four Bernstein-Fabozzi/Jacobs-Levy awards from the Journal of Portfolio Management and Institutional Investor magazine.
