= Burton Malkiel =

American economist (born 1932)

Burton Gordon Malkiel
- Born: August 28, 1932 (age 94); Boston, Massachusetts, US
- Education: Harvard University (BA, MBA); Princeton University (PhD)
- Occupation: Economist

Burton Gordon Malkiel (born August 28, 1932) is an American economist, financial executive, and writer most noted for his classic finance book A Random Walk Down Wall Street (first published 1973, in its 13th edition as of 2023).

Malkiel is the Chemical Bank Chairman's Professor of Economics at Princeton University, and is a two-time chairman of the economics department there. He was a member of the Council of Economic Advisers (1975–1977), president of the American Finance Association (1978), and dean of the Yale School of Management (1981–1988). He also spent 28 years as a director of the Vanguard Group. He is Chief Investment Officer of software-based financial advisor, Wealthfront Inc. and is a member of the Investment Advisory Board for Rebalance. Malkiel was elected to the American Philosophical Society in 2001.

He is a leading proponent of the efficient-market hypothesis, which contends that prices of publicly traded assets reflect all publicly available information, although he has also pointed out that some markets are evidently inefficient, exhibiting signs of non-random walk. Malkiel in general supports buying and holding index funds as the most effective portfolio-management strategy, but does think it is viable to actively manage "around the edges" of such a portfolio, as financial markets are not totally efficient. In a 2020 interview, Malkiel also stated he was not opposed in principle to investing or trading in single stocks (as exemplified by the popularity of Robinhood), provided the large majority of one's portfolio is index funds.

== Life and career ==
Malkiel was born on August 28, 1932, in Boston, Massachusetts. In 1949, Malkiel graduated from Boston Latin School, and went on to receive his bachelor's degree (1953) and his MBA (1955) from Harvard University. He originally went into the business world, but had always had an interest in academic economics and eventually earned his Ph.D. in economics from Princeton University in 1964 after completing a doctoral dissertation titled "Problems in the Structure of Financial Markets".

He married his first wife, Judith Atherton Malkiel, in 1954; they had one son, Jonathan. After Judith Malkiel's death in 1987, Burton Malkiel married his second wife, Nancy Weiss, in 1988. (Nancy Weiss Malkiel was Dean of the College of Princeton University from 1987 to 2011.) He served as a first lieutenant in the United States Army from 1955 to 1958.

Malkiel is on the advisory panel of Robert D. Arnott's investment management firm, Research Affiliates. Malkiel's hobbies include casino games and horse race betting, to which he applies mathematical and statistical analysis.

== Notable works ==
In addition to several books, he has also written influential articles, including "The Valuation of Closed-End Investment Company Shares", Journal of Finance (1977). This article discussed the puzzle of why closed-end fund companies typically trade at market valuations lower than the net value of their assets. If net asset value and market capitalization are only two ways of measuring the same thing, then why is there a consistent difference between them?

On July 22, 2005, Malkiel retired from 28 years of service as a director of the Vanguard Group and trustee of Vanguard Mutual funds, yet remains closely affiliated with Vanguard due to Vanguard's similar investment philosophies. In A Random Walk Down Wall Street, he frequently references Vanguard.

Malkiel is also the Chief Investment Officer of Wealthfront, an automated investment and savings service founded in 2008 currently with $10 billion under management.

== Partial bibliography ==
- Malkiel, Burton Gordon (1962). "Expectations, Bond Prices, and the Term Structure of Interest Rates". The Quarterly Journal of Economics.
- Malkiel, Burton Gordon (1966). The Term Structure of Interest Rates: Expectations and Behavior Patterns. Princeton, NJ: Princeton University Press.
- Malkiel, Burton Gordon; Richard E. Quandt (1969). Strategies and Rational Decisions in the Securities Options Market. Cambridge: MIT Press. ISBN 0-262-13056-4.
- Malkiel, Burton Gordon (1973). A Random Walk Down Wall Street: The Time-tested Strategy for Successful Investing. New York: W.W. Norton. ISBN 0-393-05500-0.
- Malkiel, Burton Gordon; Paul B. Firstenberg (1976). Managing Risk in an Uncertain Era: An Analysis for Endowed Institutions. Princeton, NJ: Princeton University.
- Malkiel, Burton Gordon (1980). The Inflation Beater's Investment Guide: Winning Strategies for the 1980s. New York: W.W. Norton. ISBN 0-393-01355-3.
- Cragg, J.G.; Burton Gordon Malkiel (1982). Expectations and the structure of share prices. Chicago: University of Chicago Press. ISBN 0-226-11668-9.
- Malkiel, Burton Gordon (1982). Winning Investment Strategies. New York: W.W. Norton. ISBN 0-393-30031-5.
- Malkiel, Burton Gordon; J.P. Mei (1998). Global Bargain Hunting: The Investor's Guide to Profits in Emgerging Markets. New York: Simon & Schuster. ISBN 0-684-83518-5.
- Evans, Richard E.; Burton Gordon Malkiel (1999). Earn More (Sleep Better): The Index Fund Solution. New York: Simon & Schuster. ISBN 0-684-85250-0.
- Malkiel, Burton Gordon (2003). The Efficient Market Hypothesis and Its Critics. Princeton, NJ: Center for Economic Policy Studies, Princeton University.
- Malkiel, Burton Gordon (2003). The Random Walk Guide to Investing: Ten Rules for Financial Success (2003 ed.). New York: W.W. Norton. ISBN 0-393-05854-9.
- Malkiel, Burton Gordon; Patricia A. Taylor (2008). From Wall Street to the Great Wall: How Investors Can Profit from China's Booming Economy. New York: W.W. Norton. ISBN 978-0-393-06478-0.
- Malkiel, Burton Gordon; Charles D. Ellis (2010). The Elements of Investing. Hoboken, New Jersey: John Wiley & Sons. ISBN 978-0-470-52849-5.
- Burton G. Malkiel: A Random Walk Down Wall Street. The Best Investment Tactic for the New Century, Norton & Company, New York 2011 ISBN 978-0-393-32040-4

== See also ==
- Brownian motion
- Stochastic process
