= John C. Bogle =

American investor and business magnate (1929–2019)

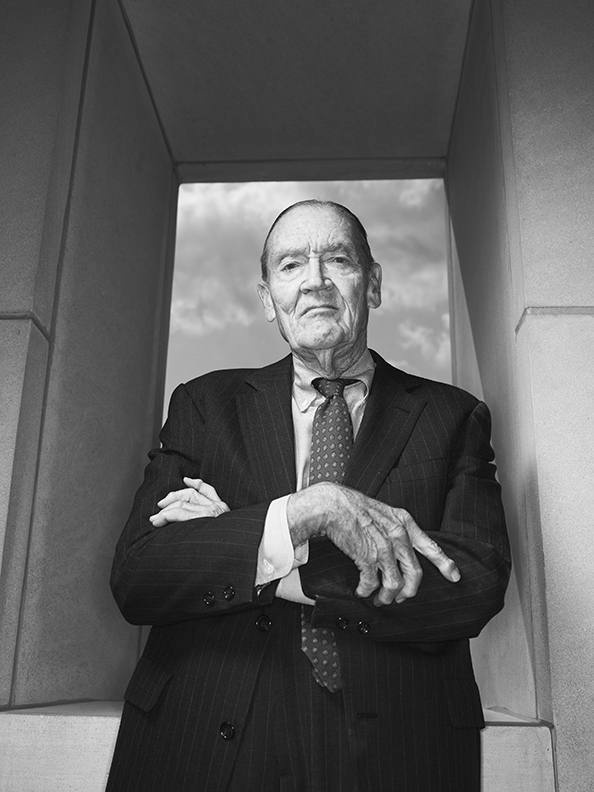
- John Bogle in 2007
- Born: John Clifton Bogle; May 8, 1929; Montclair, New Jersey, US
- Died: January 16, 2019 (aged 89); Bryn Mawr, Pennsylvania, US
- Education: Blair Academy; Princeton University (BA)
- Occupations: Investor; business magnate; philanthropist
- Known for: Founding and leading The Vanguard Group
- Spouse: Eve Sherrerd (m. 1956)
- Children: 6

John Clifton "Jack" Bogle (May 8, 1929 – January 16, 2019) was an American investor, business magnate and philanthropist who was the founder of The Vanguard Group and is credited with popularizing the index fund. An avid investor and money manager himself, he preached investment over speculation, long-term patience over short-term action, and reducing broker fees as much as possible.

An ideal investment vehicle for Bogle was a low-cost index fund representing the entire US market, held over a lifetime with dividends reinvested.

His 1999 book Common Sense on Mutual Funds: New Imperatives for the Intelligent Investor became a bestseller and is considered a classic within the investment community.

== Early life and education ==
John Bogle was born on May 8, 1929, in Montclair, New Jersey, to William Yates Bogle, Jr. and Josephine Lorraine Hipkins. He was the great grandson of Philander Banister Armstrong, who Bogle referred to as his "spiritual progenitor". Armstrong was the founder and president of the Phoenix Mutual Fire Insurance Company and is noted for his attempt to reform the fire and life insurance industries.

His Scottish-American family was harmed by the Great Depression. They were well-off but lost it all. His father fell into alcoholism, which resulted in his parents' divorce.

Bogle and his twin, David, lived with their parents in Spring Lake, New Jersey and attended Manasquan High School near the New Jersey shore for a time. Their academic record there enabled them to transfer to Blair Academy on work scholarships. Bogle credited his mother's determination for their education in this boarding school despite the family's lack of money. The twins remained close throughout their adult lives.

At Blair, Bogle showed a particular aptitude for mathematics, with numbers and computations fascinating him. In 1947, he graduated from Blair Academy cum laude and was accepted at Princeton University, where he studied economics and investment. During his university years, Bogle studied the mutual fund industry. He spent his junior and senior years working on his thesis "The Economic Role of the Investment Company".

After graduating magna cum laude from Princeton in 1951, Bogle was soon hired by Walter L. Morgan, founder of the Wellington Fund, reportedly as a result of Morgan reading his 130-page thesis.

== Investment career ==
After graduating from Princeton, Bogle sought a position in banking or investments. Hired by Morgan at the Wellington Fund, Bogle was promoted as assistant to Morgan in 1955, at which time he was able to explore various parts of Wellington and to analyze the company and its investment department. Bogle persuaded Wellington to change its strategy of concentrating on a single fund and to create a new fund. Eventually he succeeded, and the new fund became a turning point in his career and is considered his biggest achievement at that time. After successfully climbing through the ranks, Bogle replaced Morgan as chairman of Wellington's mutual funds in 1970, but was later fired for an "extremely unwise" merger that he had approved. It was a poor decision which he later considered his biggest career mistake, stating: "The great thing about that mistake, which was shameful and inexcusable and a reflection of immaturity and confidence beyond what the facts justified, was that I learned a lot." He was motivated to form an index fund partly as a result of the merger's aftermath, the terms of which prohibited him from managing money directly on behalf of clients. Following an index created by Standard & Poor's allowed the creation of a fund that Bogle himself did not oversee.

In 1974, Bogle founded The Vanguard Group, which is now one of the largest investment management companies. In 1999, Fortune magazine named Bogle as "one of the four investment giants of the twentieth century".

In 1975, Bogle introduced the first index mutual fund, coined "Bogle's Folly" by critics and derided as un-American for its new, passive approach.

In 1976, influenced by the works of Paul Samuelson, Bogle created the First Index Investment Trust (a precursor to the Vanguard 500 Index Fund) as one of the first index mutual funds available to the general public. It was designed to mimic the performance of S&P 500. It was not immediately well received by individuals or the investment industry but is now lauded by investment legend Warren Buffett, among others. In a 2005 speech, Samuelson ranked "this Bogle invention along with the invention of the wheel, the alphabet, Gutenberg printing".

In 1984, Bogle met with the management team of Primecap to launch a fund together. In November 1984, the Vanguard Primecap Fund was launched.

Bogle suffered heart issues in the 1990s, subsequently relinquishing his role as Vanguard CEO in 1996. His successor was John J. Brennan, his handpicked heir and second-in-command, whom he had hired in 1982. Bogle, who was then 66 and "considered past the age for a healthy heart transplant", had a successful heart transplant in 1996.

His subsequent return to Vanguard with the title of senior chairman led to conflict between Bogle and Brennan. Bogle left the company in 1999 and moved to Bogle Financial Markets Research Center, a small research institute not directly connected to Vanguard but located on the Vanguard campus.

== Investment philosophy ==
The idea of passive investing in a fund that mirrors the entire stock market developed in the 1960s, mainly among University of Chicago researchers who found it was difficult or impossible to consistently pick winning stocks that will perform better than average. These researchers also argued that transaction and management costs were a significant drain on long-term investing returns.

The first index fund available to the general public was established in 1973 by Rex Sinquefield, who later went on to work at Dimensional Fund Advisors. This fund had billions of dollars under management after a few years, indicating the public was open to the new investing concept.

Bogle's early investing career was devoted to active management, though he was always aware of the importance of low fees and his funds had substantially lower costs than competitors. As academic research accumulated in favor of indexing, Bogle helped popularize these ideas and created an S&P 500 fund in 1975. He argued the index fund would mimic the index performance over the long run—thus achieving higher returns with lower costs than the costs associated with actively managed funds.

Bogle says his idea of index investing offers a clear yet prominent distinction between investment and speculation. The main difference between investment and speculation lies in the time horizon and the risk of capital. Investment is concerned with capturing returns on the long run with lower risk of destruction of capital, while speculation is concerned with achieving returns over a short period of time, with potentially destructive risk to capital. The speculator is often only concerned with the price of a security and not the underlying business as a whole, while the investor is concerned with the underlying business and not the price of the security. Even if a business is steady in cash flow, the market quotations of a security are anything but, as a result of speculators driving up prices and bringing down prices based on hope, fear and greed. Bogle believed this is an important analysis to be taken into account as short-term, risky investments have been flooding the financial markets.

Bogle was known for his insistence, in numerous media appearances and in writing, on the superiority of index funds over traditional actively managed mutual funds. He contended that it is folly to attempt to pick actively managed mutual funds and expect their performance to beat a low-cost index fund over a long period of time, after accounting for the fees that actively managed funds charge. He was also keenly aware of the importance of overall market valuation, and developed a simple but reliable method to forecast long-term returns over decade-long periods. Bogle added existing dividend yield to expected earnings growth, then adjusted for overall market valuation as measured by price to earnings ratio and corrected for inflation. He argued most investors should have a minimum 20% bond allocation to reduce fluctuations over the short run of publicly listed share prices, and should tend to increase their bond allocation when stocks became overvalued and as they age but should maintain at least a 20% stock allocation.

In the late 1990s dot-com bubble, Bogle sold most of his stocks and correctly anticipated poor returns on stocks and superior results from bonds over the next ten years.

His investment philosophy is the founding principle of the eponymous "Bogleheads" forum. This group is now supported by the John C. Bogle Center for Financial Literacy and hosts national conferences in addition to its online forum. Members of the group have collaborated to write three books expanding upon Bogle's investment philosophy.

Later in his life, Bogle expressed concerns that the growing popularity of passive indexing would lead to a concentration of corporate voting power for leaders of the three largest investment firms (Vanguard, BlackRock, and State Street), adding, "I do not believe that such a concentration would serve the national interest."

== Philanthropy ==
In 1968, he established the Bogle Brothers Scholars Program at Blair Academy, which has since provided the gift of a Blair education to nearly 200 students.

In 1991, he established The Armstrong Foundation, where "he gave back to the schools that had given him scholarships early in his life, the hospitals that had fixed his heart, his church, and the United Way".

In 2012, Bogle said in an interview "My only regret about money is that I don't have more to give away".

In 2016, the Bogle Fellowship was established at Princeton University by John C. Bogle Jr, Bogle's son. The fellowship sponsors 20 first year students in each class.

Shortly before his death in 2019, Bogle's net worth was estimated at $80 million.

== Awards and honors ==
- Named one of the investment industry's four "Giants of the 20th Century" by Fortune magazine in 1999.
- Named one of the "world's 100 most powerful and influential people" by Time magazine in 2004.
- Institutional Investor's Lifetime Achievement Award (2004).
- Elected to the American Philosophical Society (2004).

== Personal life ==
Bogle attended his wife's Presbyterian church, but maintained his faith as an Episcopalian.

At age 31, Bogle suffered from his first of several cardiac arrests, and at age 38, he was diagnosed with the rare heart disease arrhythmogenic right ventricular dysplasia. He received a heart transplant in 1996 at age 66.

Bogle received honorary doctorates from Princeton University in 2005 and Villanova University in 2011. Bogle served on the board of trustees of the National Constitution Center in Philadelphia, a museum dedicated to the U.S. Constitution. He had previously served as chairman of the board from 1999 through 2007.

Politically, Bogle was a Republican (a self-described Teddy Roosevelt Republican), although he voted for Bill Clinton, Barack Obama in 2008 and 2012, and Hillary Clinton in 2016. He supported the Volcker rule and tighter rules on money market funds, and was critical of what he believed was the US government's lack of regulation of the financial sector. Bogle said the current system in the US had "gotten out of balance", and advocated for "taxes to discourage short-term speculation, limits on leverage, transparency for financial derivatives, stricter punishments for financial crimes, and a unified fiduciary standard for all money managers". In 2017, Bogle stated his belief that President Donald Trump's policies were good for the market in the short term, but dangerous for society as a whole in the long term.

Bogle died on January 16, 2019, at his home in Bryn Mawr, Pennsylvania. After Bogle's death, Warren Buffett paid tribute to Bogle's contribution in helping individual investors steer in a better "direction" in the field of investing. "Jack did more for American investors as a whole than any individual I've known", Buffett said in a CNBC interview. Bogle was also previously mentioned in Berkshire Hathaway's 2016 annual shareholder letter for his contribution of developing the investment landscape.

== Works ==
- Bogle on Mutual Funds: New Perspectives for the Intelligent Investor (McGraw-Hill, 1993), ISBN 1-55623-860-6
- Common Sense on Mutual Funds: New Imperatives for the Intelligent Investor (John Wiley & Sons, 1999), ISBN 0-471-39228-6
- John Bogle on Investing: The First 50 Years (McGraw-Hill, 2000), ISBN 0-07-136438-2
- Character Counts: The Creation and Building of The Vanguard Group (McGraw-Hill, 2002) ISBN 0-07-139115-0
- The Battle for the Soul of Capitalism (Yale University Press, 2005), ISBN 0-300-10990-3
- The Little Book of Common Sense Investing: The Only Way to Guarantee Your Fair Share of Stock Market Returns (John Wiley & Sons, 2007), ISBN 978-0-470-10210-7
- Enough : True Measures of Money, Business, and Life (John Wiley & Sons, 2008), ISBN 978-0-470-39851-7
- Common Sense on Mutual Funds: Fully Updated 10th Anniversary Edition (John Wiley & Sons, 2009), ISBN 0-470-13813-0
- Don't Count on it!: Reflections on Investment Illusions, Capitalism, "Mutual" Funds, Indexing, Entrepreneurship, Idealism, and Heroes (John Wiley & Sons, 2010) ISBN 978-0-470-64396-9
- The Clash of the Cultures: Investment vs. Speculation (John Wiley & Sons, 2012) ISBN 978-1118122778
- The Little Book of Common Sense Investing: The Only Way to Guarantee Your Fair Share of Stock Market Returns 10th Anniversary Edition, Updated and Revised (John Wiley & Sons, 2017), ISBN 978-1-119-40450-7
- Stay the Course: The Story of Vanguard and the Index Revolution (John Wiley & Sons, 2018) ISBN 978-1119404309
