= The Vanguard Group =

American investment management company

The Vanguard Group, Inc.
- Type: Private
- Industry: Investment management
- Founded: May 1, 1975; 51 years ago
- Founder: John C. Bogle
- Headquarters: Malvern, Pennsylvania, U.S.
- Key people: Salim Ramji (CEO); Mark Loughridge (chairman); Greg Davis (president & CIO)
- Products: Asset management; Wealth management
- AUM: ▲US$13.3 trillion (as of 2025)
- Number of employees: ▲20,000 (as of December 31, 2025)
- Subsidiaries: Vanguard Capital Management, LLC; Vanguard Portfolio Management, LLC
- Website: investor.vanguard.com

The Vanguard Group, Inc. is an American registered investment adviser founded on May 1, 1975, and based in Malvern, Pennsylvania, with approximately $13.3 trillion in global assets under management as of 2025. It is the largest provider of mutual funds and the second-largest provider of exchange-traded funds (ETFs) in the world after BlackRock's iShares. In addition to mutual funds and ETFs, Vanguard offers brokerage services, educational account services, financial planning, asset management, and trust services. Several mutual funds managed by Vanguard are ranked at the top of the list of mutual funds in the United States by assets under management. Along with BlackRock and State Street, Vanguard is considered to be one of the Big Three index fund managers.

Founder and former chairman John C. Bogle is credited with the creation of the first index fund available to individual investors and was a proponent and major enabler of low-cost investing by individuals, though Rex Sinquefield has also been credited with the first index fund a few years before Bogle.

Vanguard is owned by the funds managed by the company and is therefore owned by its customers. Vanguard offers two classes of most of its funds: investor shares and admiral shares. Admiral shares have slightly lower expense ratios but require a higher minimum investment, often between $3,000 and $100,000 per fund. Vanguard's corporate headquarters is in Malvern, a suburb of Philadelphia, Pennsylvania. It has satellite offices in Charlotte, North Carolina; Dallas, Texas; Washington, D.C.; and Scottsdale, Arizona, as well as Canada, Australia, Asia, and Europe.

== History ==
=== Formation ===
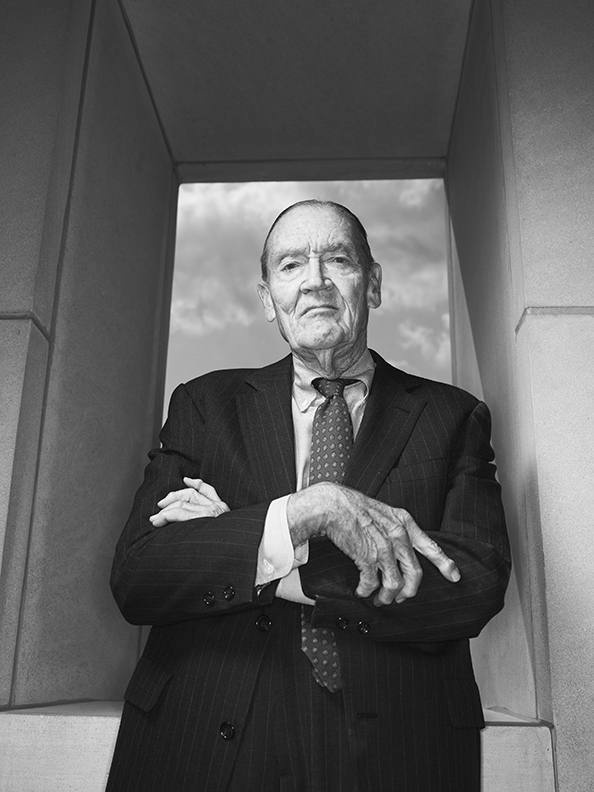
John C. Bogle in 2007

In 1951, for his undergraduate thesis at Princeton University, John C. Bogle conducted a study in which he found that most mutual funds did not earn more money compared to broad stock market indexes. Even if the stocks in the funds beat the benchmark index, management fees reduced the returns to investors below the returns of the benchmark.

Immediately after graduating from Princeton University in 1951, Bogle was hired by Wellington Management Company. In 1966, he forged a merger with a fund management group based in Boston. He became president in 1967 and CEO in 1970. However, the merger ended badly and Bogle was therefore fired in 1974. Bogle has said about being fired: "The great thing about that mistake, which was shameful and inexcusable and a reflection of immaturity and confidence beyond what the facts justified, was that I learned a lot. And if I had not been fired then, there would not have been a Vanguard."

Bogle arranged to start a new fund division at Wellington. He named it Vanguard, after Horatio Nelson's flagship at the Battle of the Nile, HMS Vanguard. Bogle chose this name after a dealer in antique prints left him a book about Great Britain's naval achievements that featured HMS Vanguard. Wellington executives initially resisted the name, but narrowly approved it after Bogle mentioned that Vanguard funds would be listed alphabetically next to Wellington Funds.

=== Growth of company ===
The Wellington executives prohibited the fund from engaging in advisory or fund management services. Bogle saw this as an opportunity to start a passive fund tied to the performance of the S&P 500, which was established in 1957. Bogle was also inspired by Paul Samuelson, an economist who later won the Nobel Memorial Prize in Economic Sciences, who wrote in an August 1976 column in Newsweek that retail investors needed an opportunity to invest in stock market indexes such as the S&P 500.

In 1976, after getting approval from the board of directors of Wellington, Bogle established the First Index Investment Trust (now called the Vanguard 500 Index Fund). This was one of the earliest passive investing index funds, preceded a few years earlier by a handful of others (e.g., Jeremy Grantham's Batterymarch Financial Management in Boston, and index funds managed by Rex Sinquefield at American National Bank in Chicago, and John "Mac" McQuown at Wells Fargo's San Francisco office).

Bogle's S&P 500 index fund raised $11 million in its initial public offering (equivalent to $62 million in 2025), compared to expectations of raising $150 million (equivalent to $850 million in 2025). The banks that managed the public offering suggested that Bogle cancel the fund due to the weak reception, but Bogle refused. At this time, Vanguard had only three employees: Bogle and two analysts. Asset growth in the first years was slow, partially because the fund did not pay commissions to brokers who sold it, which was unusual at the time. Within a year, the fund had only grown to $17 million in assets (equivalent to $90 million in 2025), but one of the Wellington Funds that Vanguard was administering had to be merged in with another fund, and Bogle convinced Wellington to merge it in with the Index fund. This brought assets up to almost $100 million (equivalent to $530 million in 2025).

Growth in assets accelerated after the beginning of a bull market in 1982, and the indexing model became more popular at other companies. These copy funds were not successful since they typically charged higher fees, which defeated the purpose of index funds. In November 1984, Vanguard launched the Vanguard Primecap fund in collaboration with Primecap. In December 1986, Vanguard launched its second mutual fund, a bond index fund called the Total Bond Fund, which was the first bond index fund ever offered to individual investors. One earlier criticism of the first Index fund was that it was only an index of the S&P 500. In December 1987, Vanguard launched its third fund, the Vanguard Extended Market Index Fund, an index fund of the entire stock market, excluding the S&P 500. Over the next five years, other funds were launched, including a small-cap index fund, an international stock index fund, and a total stock market index fund. During the 1990s, more funds were offered, and several Vanguard funds, including the S&P 500 index fund and the total stock market fund, became among the largest funds in the world, and Vanguard became the largest mutual fund company in the world. Noted investor John Neff retired as manager of Vanguard's Windsor Fund in 1995, after a 30-year career in which his fund beat returns of the S&P 500 index by an average of 300 basis points (3%) per year.

=== 1999–present ===
Bogle retired from Vanguard as chairman in 1999 when he reached the company's mandatory retirement age of 70 and he was succeeded by John J. ("Jack") Brennan. In February 2008, F. William McNabb III became President and in August 2008, he became CEO. Both of Bogle's successors expanded Vanguard's offerings beyond the index mutual funds that Bogle preferred, in particular into ETFs and actively managed funds. Some of Vanguard's actively-managed funds predate Bogle's retirement however (their healthcare stock fund began in 1984). Bogle had been skeptical of ETFs as they trade mid-day like single stocks while mutual funds trade on a single price at day's end. He believed buy and hold investors could make good use of ETFs tracking broad indices, but thought ETFs had potentially higher fees due to the bid ask spread, could be too narrowly specialized, and worried anything that could be traded mid-day would be traded mid-day, potentially reducing investor returns.

In May 2017, Vanguard launched a fund platform in the United Kingdom. In July 2017, it was announced that McNabb would be replaced as chief executive officer by chief investment officer Mortimer J. Buckley, effective January 1, 2018. McNabb remains at the company as chairman. In 2020, Vanguard launched a digital adviser and began building up an investment team in China. In October 2020, Vanguard returned about $21 billion in managed assets to government clients in China due to concerns about legal compliance, staffing and profitability. Vanguard ceased operations in China in November 2023, after facing criticism from a US protectionist lobbying group.

In February 2021, Vanguard launched its fractional share program of its ETFs, where investors can invest for as little as $1. Fractional share ownership is a derivative of micro-investing, a type of investment strategy that is designed to make investing regular, accessible and affordable, especially for those who may not have a lot of money to invest or who are new to investing. In November 2022, Vanguard launched its superannuation fund in Australia under the name Vanguard Super. In May 2024, Vanguard announced the appointment of Salim Ramji, a veteran from BlackRock and the first outsider to lead Vanguard, as its next CEO, succeeding Mortimer J. Buckley, effective July 2024.

In December 2024, Vanguard entered into a passivity agreement with the Federal Deposit Insurance Corporation (FDIC), restricting its ability to influence the management or policies of FDIC-supervised banks in which it holds stakes of more than 10%. In January 2025, the company agreed to pay $106.41 million to settle SEC charges of misleading statements about the tax consequences of changes to its target-date retirement funds, after a 2020 reduction in investment minimums triggered large capital gains distributions for retail investors in taxable accounts. In December 2025, Vanguard began allowing cryptocurrency ETFs and mutual funds to trade on its brokerage platform, reversing its earlier policy; in January 2024 it had blocked clients from trading newly launched spot Bitcoin ETFs. The firm said it had no plans to launch its own crypto products.

In August 2026, Vanguard acquired fintech platform Altruist for $4 billion.

=== Investments in companies that add to carbon emissions ===
In March 2021, Vanguard joined over 70 asset managers, aiming to have companies within their portfolios to achieve net-zero emissions by 2060, a goal that parallels the Paris Agreement. As of 2021, Vanguard had companies within investor portfolios that contribute to fossil fuel production and the furtherance of climate change, such as ENAP Sipetrol, China National Petroleum Corporation (CPNC), and Petroamazonas. Vanguard held at least $86 billion invested in the coal industry in 2021, making Vanguard the world's number one investor in the industry. Additionally, in 2021, the company held $2.6 billion in debt and $9.6 billion in equities for oil companies working within the Amazon rainforest.

=== Ties with Israel during the Gaza genocide ===
In 2025, Vanguard was included in a UN report on corporations complicit in the Gaza genocide as one of the main investors in military and technology firms supporting the Gaza war, including Caterpillar Inc., Chevron, Palantir, Lockheed Martin and Elbit Systems. According to the report, the company can be held liable when providing assistance or enter into trade dealings with Israel, as it commits war crimes and forced displacement against Palestinians.

== See also ==
- FTSE Global Equity Index Series
- List of exchange-traded funds
- Money market
- Mutual fund
- FINRA
