= List of centenarians (businesspeople) =

The following is a list of centenarians – specifically, people who became famous as businesspeople – known for reasons other than their longevity. For more lists, see lists of centenarians.

Living

Name	Lifespan	Age	Reason for Notability
Claude Alphandéry	1922–2024	101	French banker and economist
William S. Anderson	1919–2021	102	British-American businessman, president of NCR (1972–1984)
Iris Apfel	1921–2024	102	American businesswoman, interior designer, and fashion designer
Bion Barnett	1857–1958	101	American banker and co-founder of the Barnett Bank
Charles D. Barney	1844–1945	101	American stockbroker and financier
Isabel Benham	1909–2013	103	American railroad finance expert
Curtis Blake	1917–2019	102	American co-founder (with his brother, S. Prestley Blake) of Friendly's
S. Prestley Blake	1914–2021	106	American co-founder (with his brother, Curtis Blake), of Friendly's
Rose Blumkin	1893–1998	104	Russian-American founder of Nebraska Furniture Mart
Mikelis Brizga	1911–2012	101	Australian businessman
Nelson Broms	1919–2023	104	American businessman and philanthropist
Godfrey Lowell Cabot	1861–1962	101	American businessman
Daniel Carasso	1905–2009	103	Greek-born French businessman
Philip L. Carret	1896–1998	101	American investor
Chao Kuang Piu	1920–2021	100	Hong Kong businessman and philanthropist
Cecilia Chiang	1920–2020	100	Chinese-American restaurateur
J. Harwood Cochrane	1912–2016	103	American businessman and philanthropist
William Coors	1916–2018	102	American brewer and business executive (Coors Brewing Company)
James Elliott Coyne	1910–2012	102	Canadian Governor of the Bank of Canada
Frederick C. Crawford	1891–1994	103	American industrialist and philanthropist
Maxwell Cummings	1898–2001	103	Canadian real estate builder and philanthropist
Wally Denny	1906–2008	101	Canadian Deputy Chief Scout of Scouts Canada and vice-president of Goodyear Canada
D. Howard Doane	1883–1984	100	American founder and Chairman of Doane Agricultural Services
Roy Drinkard	1920–2026	106	American real estate executive
Alberto Dualib	1919–2021	101	Brazilian businessman and football executive, chairman of Sport Club Corinthians Paulista (1993–2007)
Hilda Eisen	1917–2017	100	Polish-American businessperson, philanthropist and Holocaust survivor
Carl Falck	1907–2016	109	Norwegian businessman
Eduard von Falz-Fein	1912–2018	106	Russian-born Liechtensteiner businessman and art patron
Günter Fronius	1907–2015	107	Austrian entrepreneur
Jolie Gabor, Countess de Szigethy	1896–1997	100	Hungarian-American businesswoman and socialite; mother of Eva, Magda and Zsa Zsa Gabor
Nessim Gaon	1922–2022	100	Sudan-born Swiss financier and commodities trader
A. G. Gaston	1892–1996	103	American businessman
Archibald Glenn	1911–2012	100	Australian industrialist
Albert Hamilton Gordon	1901–2009	107	American businessman
Cecil Howard Green	1900–2003	102	British-American co-founder of Texas Instruments
Gertraud Gruber	1921–2022	100	German beautician and businesswoman
Mary Guiney	1901–2004	103	Irish business executive (chairperson of Clerys)
Walter Haefner	1910–2012	101	Swiss businessman and racehorse breeder
Ebby Halliday	1911–2015	104	American realtor
Joseph A. Hardy III	1923–2023	100	American businessman
Sir Jack Harris	1906–2009	103	British-born New Zealand businessman
Leopold Hawelka	1911–2011	100	Austrian founder of the Café Hawelka
Frances Hesselbein	1915–2022	107	American businesswoman and author
Kilian Hennessy	1907–2010	103	Irish businessman (Hennessy cognac)
Jacob H. Horwitz	1892–1992	100	American fashion businessman and philanthropist
Alf Ihlen	1900–2006	105	Norwegian factory manager
Stephen A. Jarislowsky	1925–2026	101	Canadian businessman
Isaac Charles Johnson	1811–1911	100	British cement manufacturer
Marjorie Johnson	1919–2025	106	American baker and entrepreneur
Joseph M. Juran	1904–2008	103	Romanian-American quality management guru
Irving Kahn	1905–2015	109	American financial analyst
Harry Kartz	1913–2016	102	British football chairman and investor
Yutaka Katayama	1909–2015	105	Japanese automotive executive of Nissan
Steve Kordek	1911–2012	100	American businessman and pinball machine designer
Robert Kuok	1923–	103	Malaysian businessman
Hans List	1896–1996	100	Austrian businessman
Leonard Litwin	1914–2017	102	Austrian-born American real estate developer
Peter Lloyd	1920–2022	101	Australian entrepreneur and aviator
Garnet Mackley	1883–1986	102	New Zealand head of the New Zealand Railways Department
Ronald Mansbridge	1905–2006	100	British publisher
Sir Arthur Marshall	1903–2007	103	British aviator and founder of Marshall Aerospace
Samuel McLaughlin	1871–1972	100	Canadian businessman, 1st president of General Motors Canada
Dave McCoy	1915–2020	104	American skiing businessman
William Moncrief	1920–2021	101	American businessman and oil and gas executive
Peter Mondavi	1914–2016	101	American winemaker
Sir Moses Montefiore, 1st Baronet	1784–1885	100	Italian-born British banker and philanthropist
Walter L. Morgan	1898–1998	100	American businessman and investor; founder of the Wellington Fund
Samuel L. Myers Sr.	1919–2021	101	American economist and educationist
Roy Neuberger	1903–2010	107	American financier
Louise Nippert	1911–2012	100	American businesswoman
Herbert Nootbaar	1908–2016	108	American businessman and philanthropist
Mohan Singh Oberoi	1898–2002	103	Indian hotelier
Werner Otto	1909–2011	102	German entrepreneur
Leo Pearlstein	1920–2025	104	American businessman, known for culinary public relations
Raymond G. Perelman	1917–2019	101	American businessman and philanthropist
Víctor Pey	1915–2018	103	Spanish-born Chilean engineer and businessman
Frits Philips	1905–2005	100	Dutch businessman, CEO and chairman of Philips
Apostolos Pitsos	1918–2023	104	Greek industrialist and businessman
Anthony Purssell	1926–	100	English brewing executive and businessman
William John Quinn	1911–2015	104	American railroad executive
Günter Reimann	1904–2005	100	German economist
David Rockefeller	1915–2017	101	American banker
Hagbarth Schjøtt Sr.	1894–1994	100	Norwegian businessman
Morris Schwartz	1901–2004	103	Russian-American photographer, inventor and businessman
Carl J. Shapiro	1913–2021	108	American businessman and philanthropist
Sir Run Run Shaw	1907–2014	106	Hong Kong media mogul
Hermann von Siemens	1885–1986	101	German industrialist
Robert E. Simon	1914–2015	101	American real estate entrepreneur
Bill Sinkin	1913–2014	100	American banker, entrepreneur and philanthropist
James F. Sirmons	1917–2018	100	American broadcasting executive
Sir Michael Sobell	1892–1993	100	British business leader and philanthropist
Sir Thomas Sopwith	1888–1989	101	British aircraft pioneer
Clarence W. Spangenberger	1905–2008	102	American businessman
William Clement Stone	1902–2002	100	American insurance leader
Sir James Swinburne, 9th Baronet	1858–1958	100	British electrical engineer and manufacturer
Doris Thompson	1903–2004	101	British businesswoman, managing director of Blackpool Pleasure Beach
Charles E. Toberman	1880–1981	101	American real estate developer
Eiji Toyoda	1913–2013	100	Japanese industrialist, managing director of Toyota
Bull Verweij	1909–2010	100	Dutch founder and former president of Radio Veronica
Charles Rudolph Walgreen Jr.	1906–2007	100	American former president and chairman of Walgreen Drug Company
Hans Jørgen Walle-Hansen	1912–2012	100	Norwegian partner in Brødrene Hansen
Max Webb	1917–2018	101	Polish-born American real estate developer and philanthropist
Jack Weil	1901–2008	107	American founder and CEO of Rockmount Ranch Wear
Frank H. Wheaton Sr.	1881–1983	102	American chairman of Wheaton Industries
Chuck Williams	1915–2015	100	American author and founder of Williams Sonoma
Emory Williams	1911–2014	102	American businessman, former chief executive of Sears
Oscar Wyatt	1924–2025	101	American businessman, founder of Coastal Corporation
Abdul Majid Zabuli	1896–1998	102	Afghan banker, founder of the national banking system
