= Jeffersonian architecture =

American Palladian/Neoclassical architecture

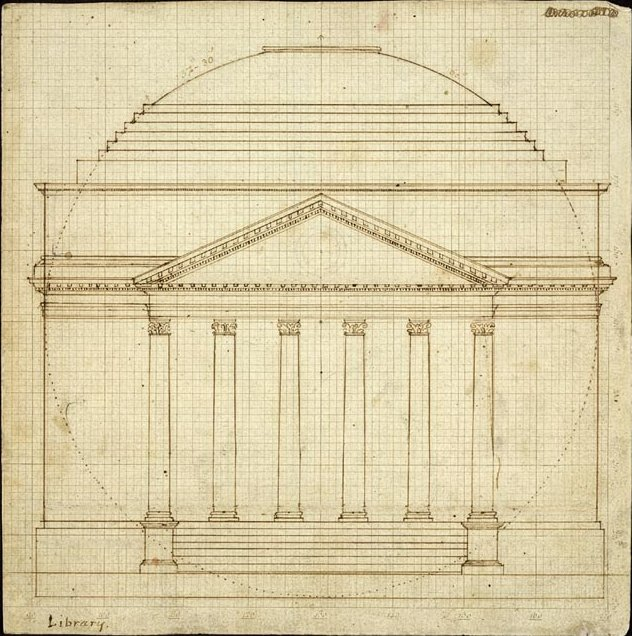
Jefferson's sketch plan for the Rotunda at the University of Virginia

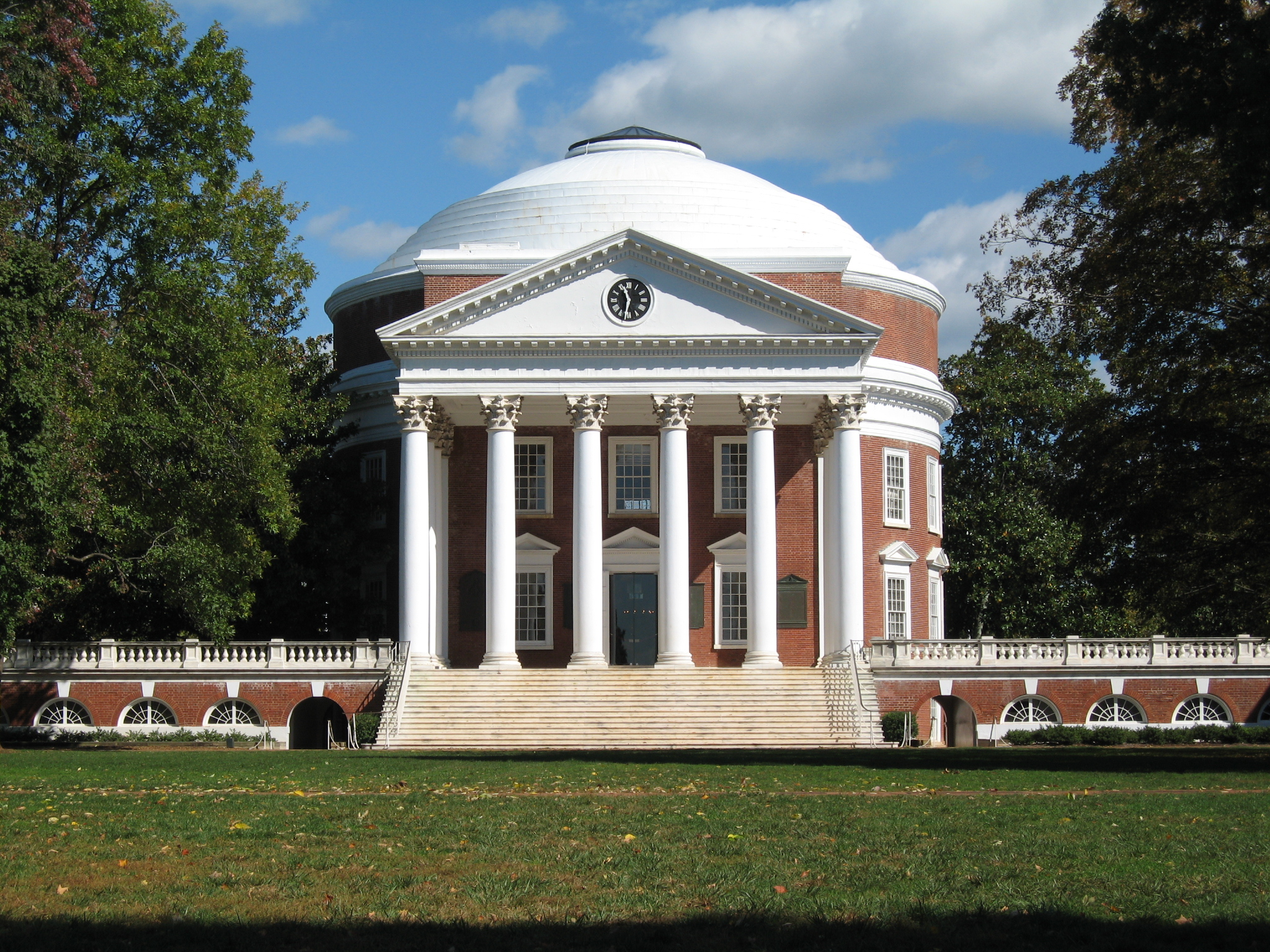
The Rotunda in 2006

Jeffersonian architecture is an American form of Neo-Classicism and/or Neo-Palladianism embodied in the architectural designs of U.S. President and polymath Thomas Jefferson, after whom it is named. These include his home (Monticello), his retreat (Poplar Forest), the university he founded (University of Virginia), and his designs for the homes of friends and political allies (notably Barboursville). More than a dozen private homes bearing his personal stamp still stand today. Jefferson's style was popular in the early American period at about the same time that the more mainstream Greek Revival architecture was also coming into vogue (1790s–1830s) with his assistance.

== Sources and inspiration ==
In colonial Virginia during the 18th century there were no schools of architecture, so Jefferson learned the profession on his own from books and by studying some of the classical architectural designs of the day. As a self-taught architect and classicist, he was most influenced by the Italian revivalist architect Andrea Palladio (1508–1580). His "bible" was Andrea Palladio's The Four Books of Architecture, which taught him the basic principles of classical design. Jeffersonian architecture is therefore perhaps best described as "Palladian" in inspiration.

Jefferson was also influenced by architect James Gibbs (1682–1754), and by French Neo-classical buildings, such as the Hôtel de Salm in Paris, when he served as Ambassador to France. While the Jeffersonian style incorporates Palladian proportions and themes, it is at the same time unique to Jefferson's own personal sensibility and the materials available to him in early republican Virginia.

Throughout his adult life Jefferson made many architectural drawings and wrote extensively about architectural design. Today there are over 600 pages of architectural documents by Jefferson now housed at the Massachusetts Historical Society and are commonly referred to as the Coolidge Collection.

== Characteristics ==
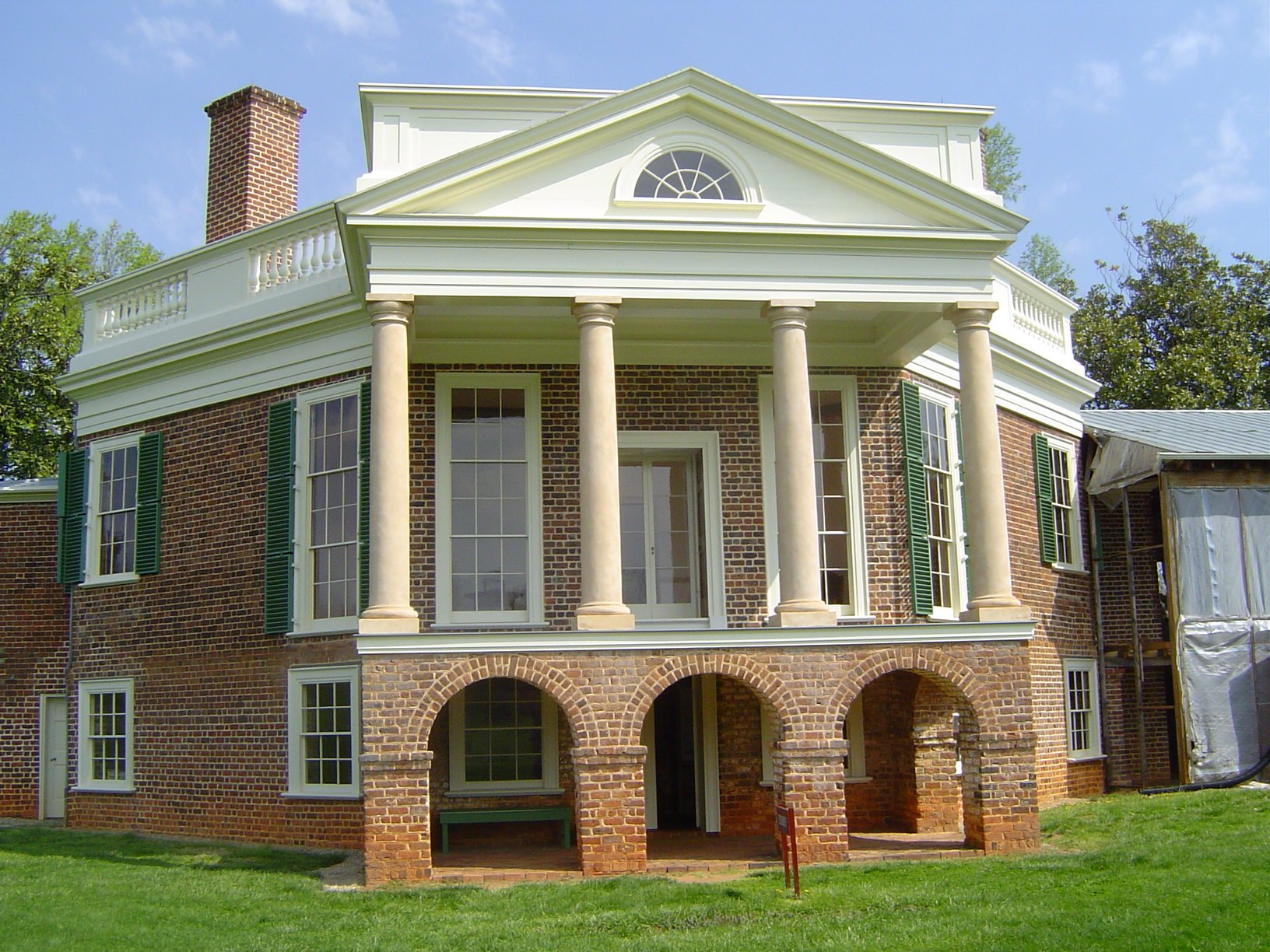
Poplar Forest, note the octagonal design

One characteristic which typifies Jefferson's architecture is the use of the octagon and octagonal forms in his designs. Palladio never used octagons, but Jefferson employed them as a design motif—halving them, elongating them, and employing them in whole as with the dome of Monticello, or the entire house at Poplar Forest.

=== Jeffersonian architectural attributes ===
- Palladian design (e.g., central core, symmetrical wings)
- Portico-and-pediment primary entries
- Classical orders and moldings (especially Tuscan)
- Piano nobile (main floor elevated above ground level)
- Red brick construction
- White painted trim
- Sand-painted columns
- Octagons and octagonal forms
- Chinese railings
- "Suppressed" (hidden) stairs, instead of grand stairways

== Monticello ==
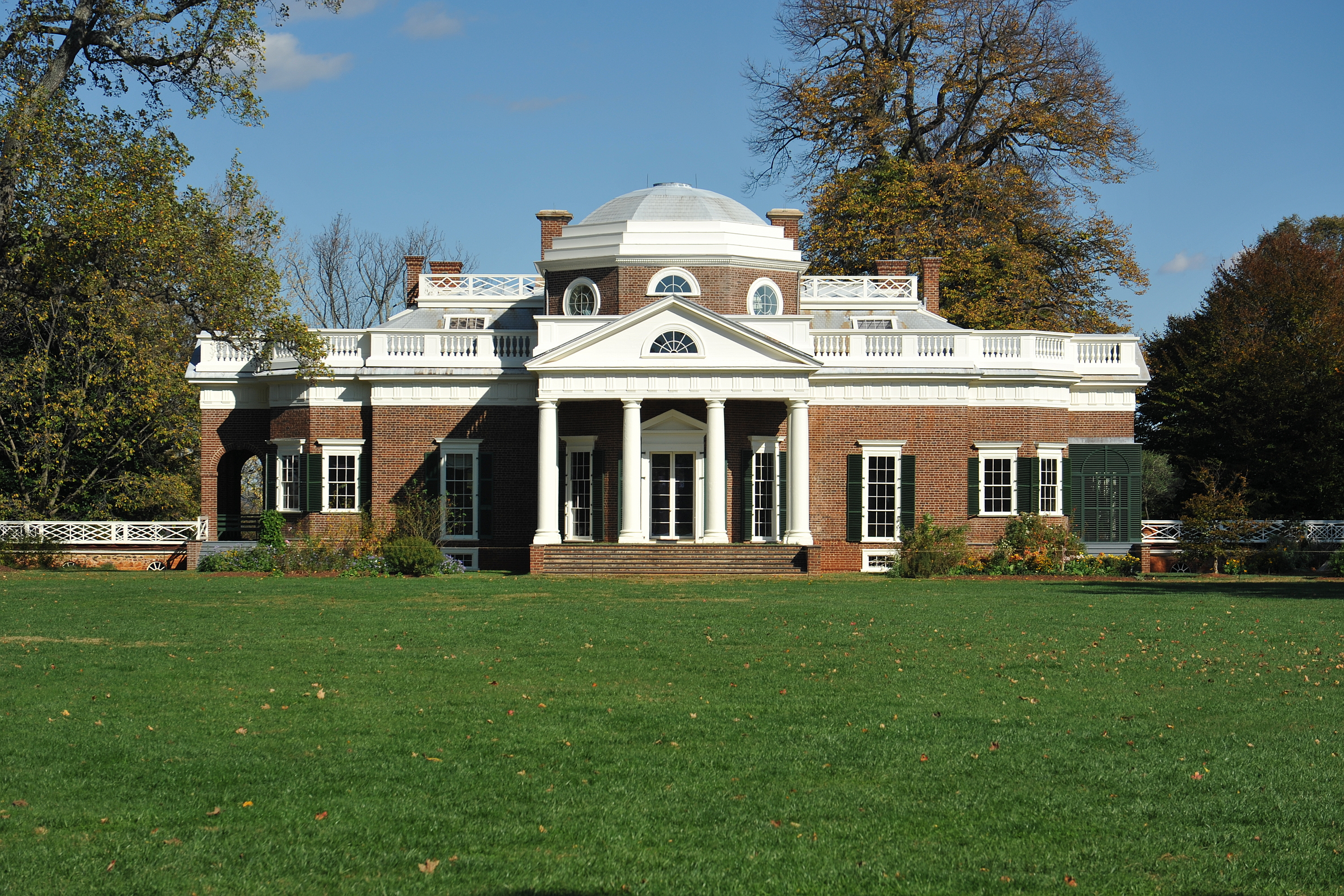
Monticello

Located just outside Charlottesville, Jefferson's Virginia home and estate is situated on the summit of an 850-foot (260 m)-high peak in the Southwest Mountains. Its name comes from the Italian for "little mountain." Jefferson began work on his original “Monticello” in 1768. He left his home in 1784 to serve as Minister of the United States to France. During his tenure in Europe, he had an opportunity to see some of the classical buildings with which he had become acquainted from his reading, as well as to discover the "modern" trends in French architecture that were then fashionable in Paris. His decision to remodel his own home may date from this period. In 1794, following his service as the first U.S. Secretary of State (1790–1793), Jefferson began rebuilding his manor house based on the ideas he had acquired in Europe. The remodeling continued throughout most of his presidency (1801–1809).

Jefferson added a center hallway and a parallel set of rooms to the structure, more than doubling its area. He removed the second full-height story from the original house and replaced it with a mezzanine bedroom floor. The most dramatic element of the new design was an octagonal dome, which he placed above the West front of the building in place of a second-story portico. The room inside the dome was described by a visitor as "a noble and beautiful apartment," but it was rarely used—perhaps because it was hot in summer and cold in winter, or because it could only be reached by climbing a steep and narrow flight of stairs. The dome room has now been restored to its appearance during Jefferson's lifetime, with "Mars yellow" walls and a painted green floor, although safety regulations about use of the narrow stairs to the upper floors largely preclude visitors to Monticello from seeing the room.

Monticello, along with the nearby University of Virginia, was designated a UNESCO World Heritage Site in 1987.

== Influence ==
Influence of the Lawn

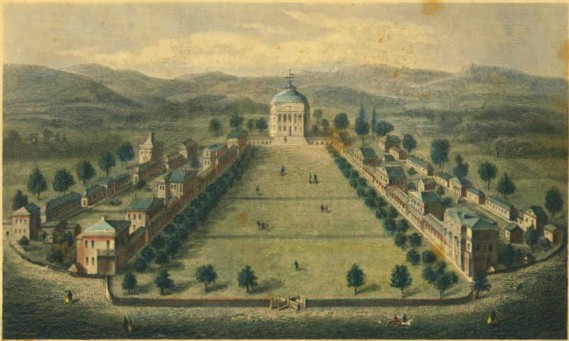
Jefferson's "Academical Village", University of Virginia (1856 engraving)

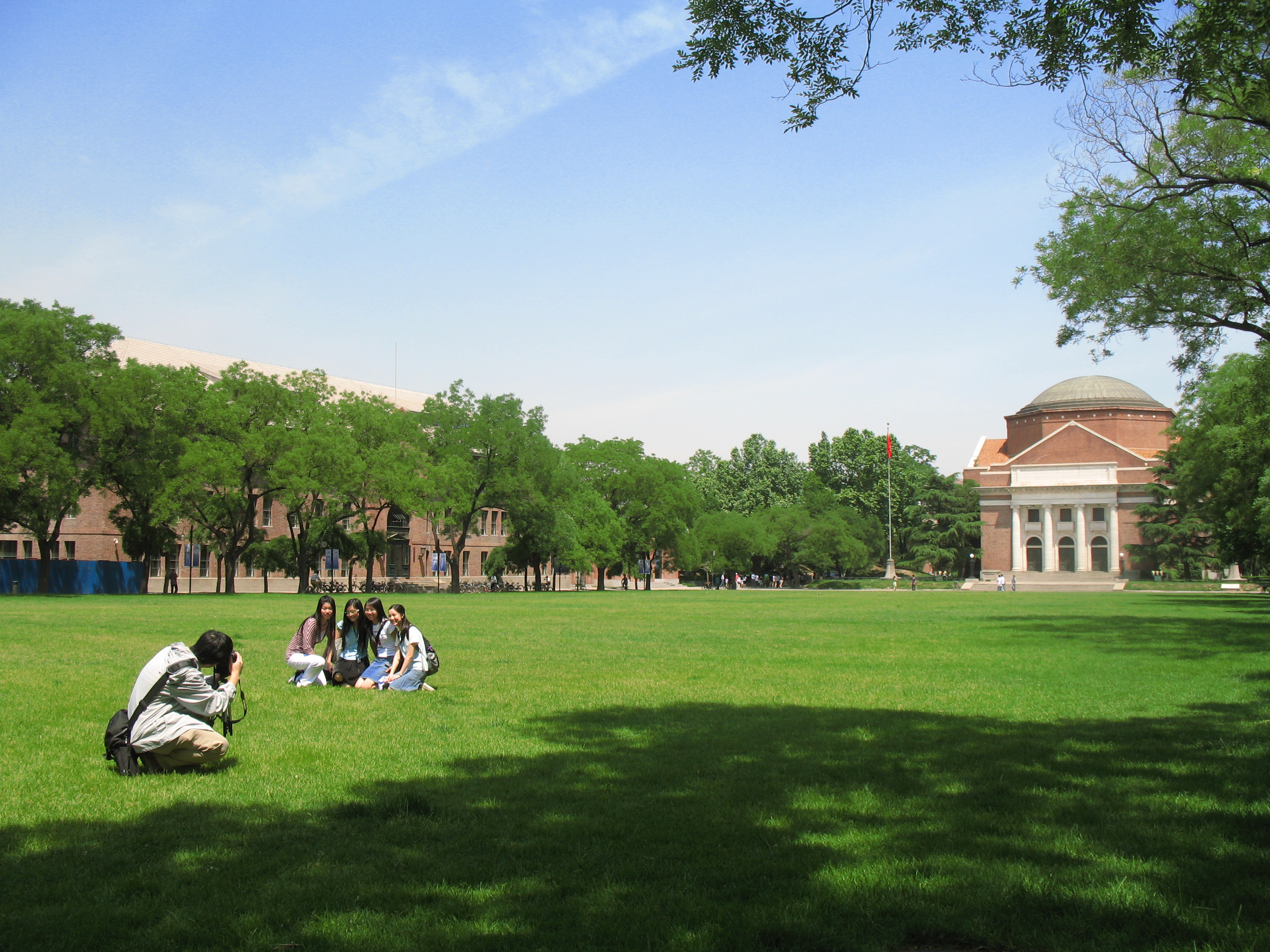
The Grand Auditorium at the Tsinghua University

In 1803, President Jefferson appointed Benjamin Henry Latrobe as surveyor of public buildings in the United States, thus introducing Greek Revival architecture to the country for the first time. Latrobe went on to design a number of important public buildings in Washington, D.C., and Philadelphia, including work on the United States Capitol and the Bank of Pennsylvania.

Even after Jefferson's style went out of vogue for other public buildings, it continued to have an influence on many Protestant church designs on the East Coast through the mid-20th century. The style is still employed on some Southern college campuses, particularly in Virginia and the Peabody College campus of Vanderbilt University, and it has enjoyed a certain re-emergence among some newer 21st century evangelical church complexes.

The University of Mary Washington, previously the University of Virginia's college for women, is another primary example of Jefferson's architecture.

An example of Jeffersonian architecture outside the United States can be found in one of China's top universities, Tsinghua University in Beijing. The university's "Grand Auditorium" was designed with elements from the Jeffersonian architectural style in the early 20th century.

== List of Jeffersonian buildings ==
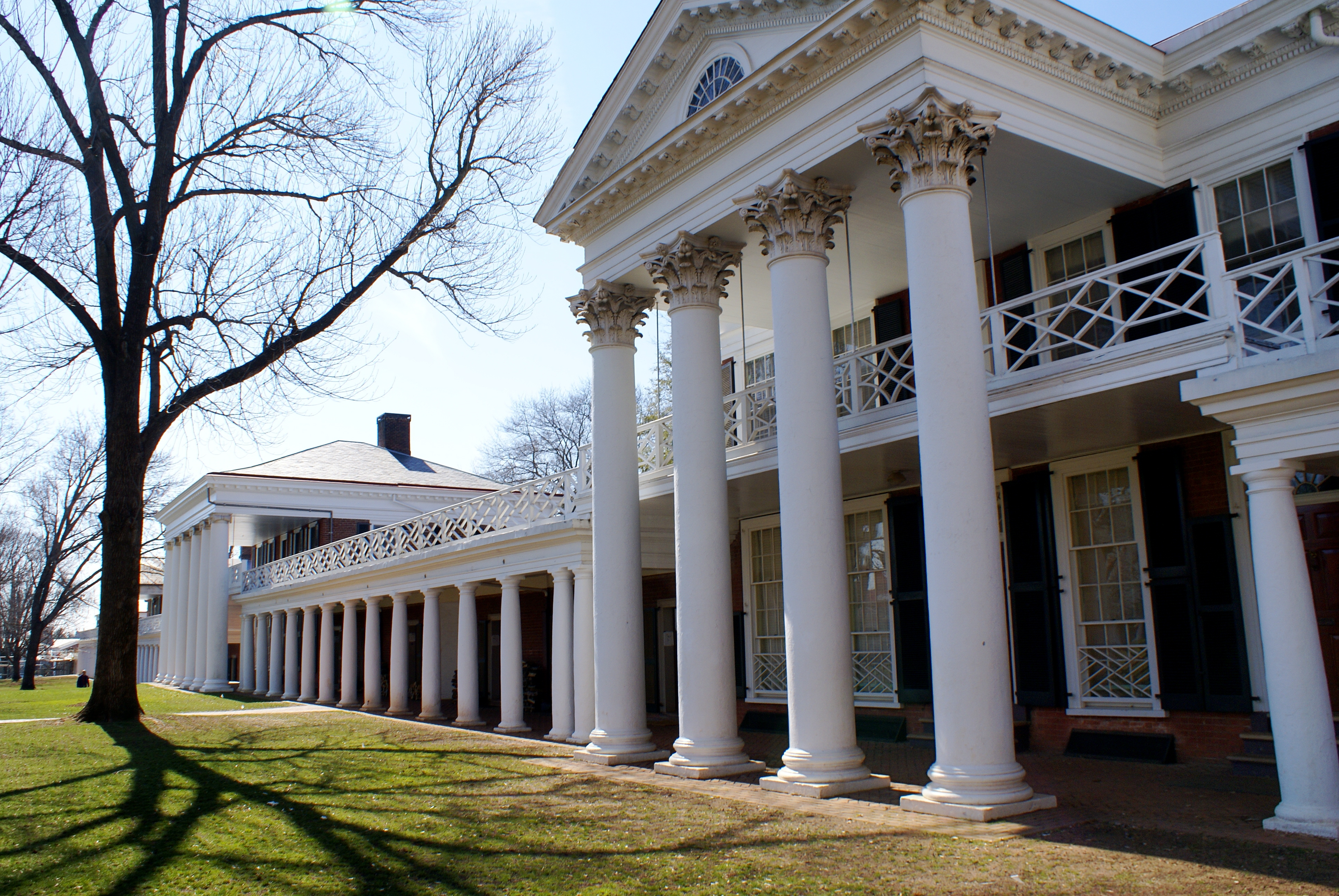
Pavilions III and V, The Lawn, University of Virginia

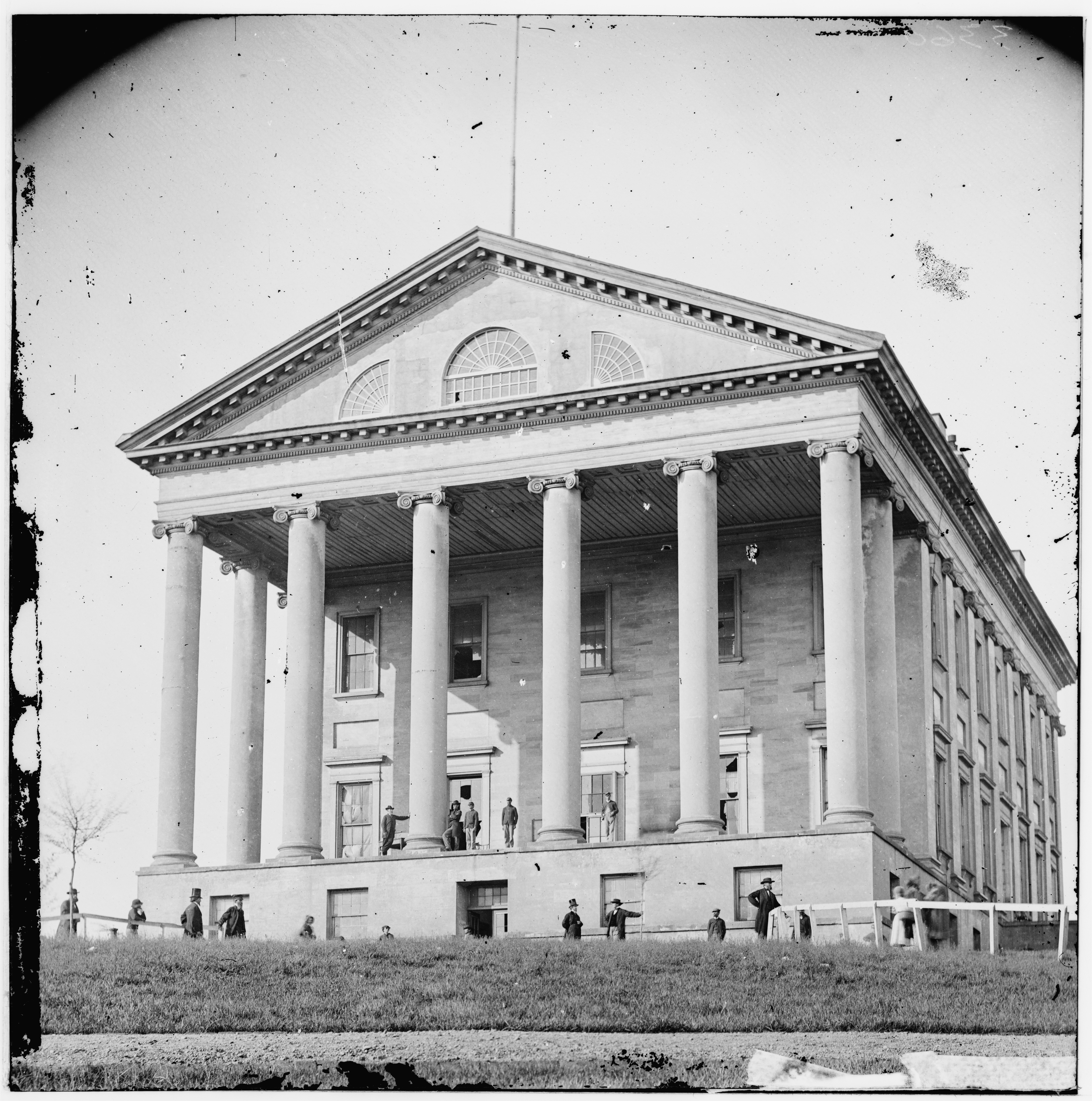
The Virginia State Capitol in 1865

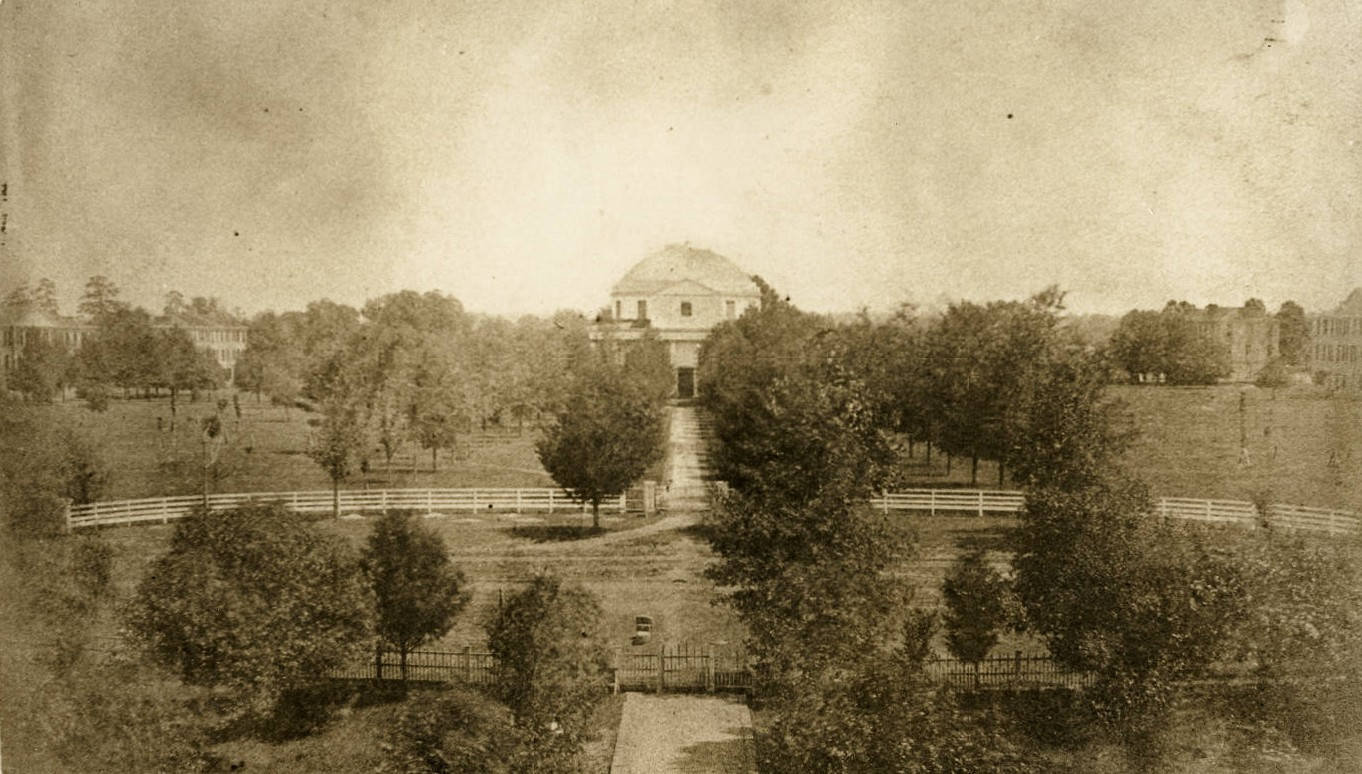
The University of Alabama Quad (rear view) in 1859; everything visible was burned in Wilson's Raid (1865) and never rebuilt.

Designed by Jefferson:

- Monticello I (1768–1784; demolished)
- Monticello (1794–1805)
- Poplar Forest (1806–1826)
- The Lawn, or "Academical Village" (1817), University of Virginia
- Farmington Country Club Main Portico, "Jefferson Room"
- Barboursville (completed c.1822; ruins)
- The Rotunda, University of Virginia (1822–1826; burnt 1895; rebuilt 1898–1899)
- Jail, Nelson County Courthouse grounds, site is present day Sheriff's Offices.
- Botetourt County Courthouse, Fincastle, Virginia. Originally completed in 1848 using plans drawn by Jefferson. Damaged by a fire and rebuilt in 1970.
- Buckingham County Courthouse, Buckingham, Virginia. Original building designed by Jefferson in 1824. Destroyed by fire in 1869.

Directly influenced by Jefferson:

- Manor house, Lower Brandon Plantation (1760s; possibly designed by Jefferson)
- Virginia State House (completed 1788; design partially credited to Jefferson)
- Manor house, Belle Grove Plantation (1794–1797; consultation by Jefferson)
- Manor house, Bremo Plantation (1819; consultation by Jefferson)

Indirectly influenced by Jefferson:

- The old University of Alabama Quad, Tuscaloosa, Alabama (1828; destroyed 1865)
- Belle Mont, Tuscumbia, Alabama (1828)
- Ruffner Hall, Longwood University (1907, destroyed 2001, rebuilt 2005)
- Various buildings, University of Mary Washington (post-1908)
- Grand Auditorium, Tsinghua University, Beijing, China (1917)
- Peabody College, Vanderbilt University, Nashville, Tennessee (1875)
- Jefferson Memorial, Washington, D.C. (1939–1943)
- Grawemeyer Hall, University of Louisville, Louisville, Kentucky (1926)
- Dallas Hall, Southern Methodist University, Dallas, Texas (1912)
- Various buildings, Christopher Newport University, Newport News, Virginia (post-2006)

== Gallery ==
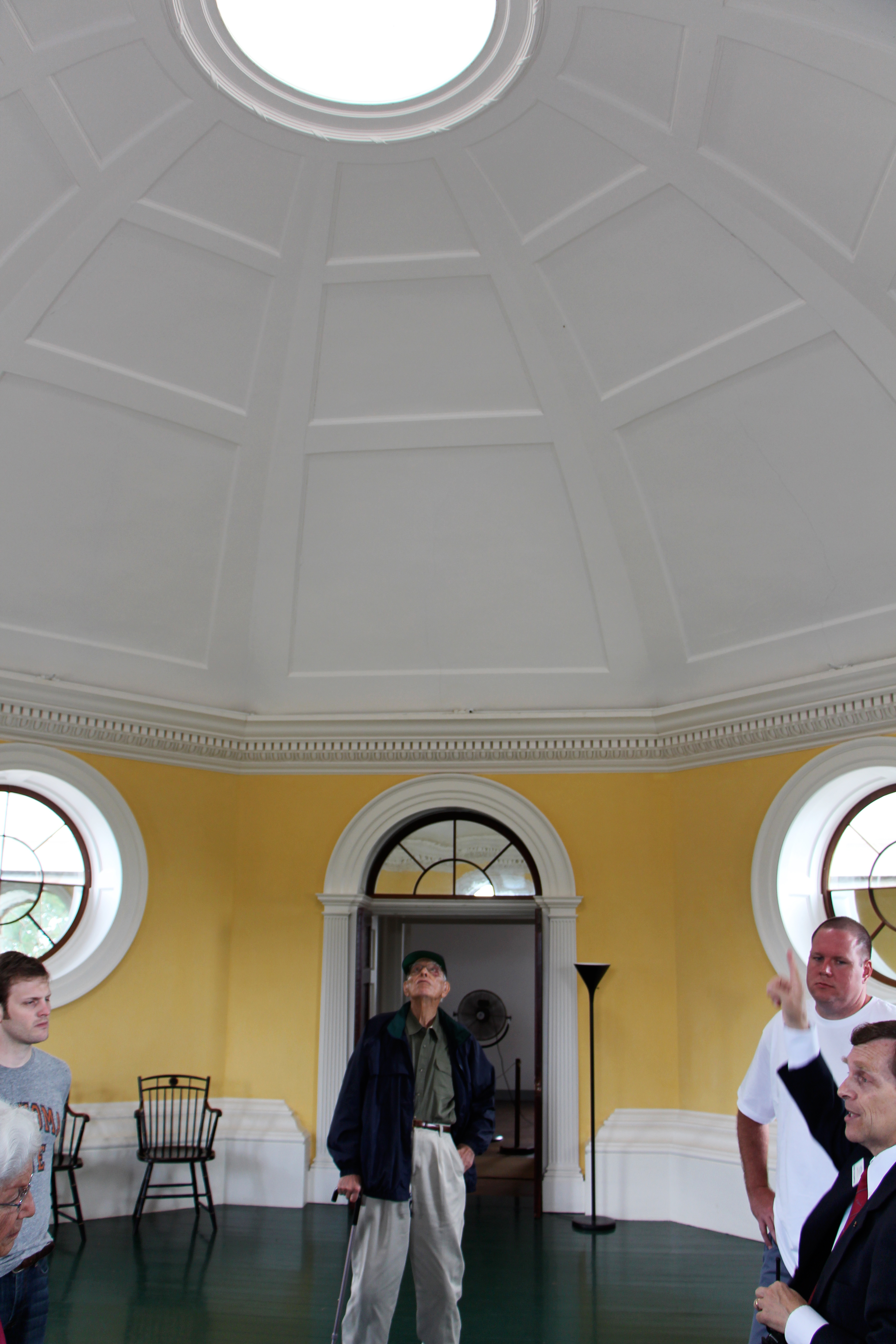
Under the dome at Monticello

== See also ==
- Monticello replicas

== Bibliography ==
- Bernstein, Richard B. (2005) [2003]. Thomas Jefferson.
  Oxford University Press. ISBN 978-0-19-518130-2.
- Brodie, Fawn (1974). Thomas Jefferson: An Intimate History.
  W. W. Norton & Company. p. 594. Url
- Wills, Garry (2002). Mr. Jefferson's University. Washington, DC:
  National Geographic Directions. ISBN 0792265319. (Describes the campus building by building.)
- The Architectural Ideology of Thomas Jefferson by Ralph G. Giordano (McFarland 2012)

=== Other sources ===
- "Thomas Jefferson Papers: Architectural Drawings, [manuscript], circa 1772-1819".
  Massachusetts Historical Society.

=== Further reading ===
- Wills, Chuck (2008). Thomas Jefferson: Architect: The Interactive Portfolio.
  Running Press; First Edition. p. 92. ISBN 978-0762434381. Book
