= Northfield Mount Hermon School =

Prep school in Gill, Massachusetts, US

Northfield Mount Hermon

Location
- 1 Lamplighter Way; Gill, Massachusetts 01354; United States; 42°40′03″N 72°29′08″W

Information
- School type: Private, day and boarding, college-preparatory
- Motto: Education for the Head, Heart, and Hand; Discere et vivere (Learn and Live)
- Established: 1879; 147 years ago
- Founder: Dwight L. Moody
- Head of school: Brian H. Hargrove
- Faculty: 90 (on an FTE basis)
- Enrollment: 630 total 84% boarding 16% day
- Average class size: 13
- Student to teacher ratio: 6:1
- Campus size: 215 acres (core campus), 1,353 acres (total land holdings)
- Campus type: Rural
- Colors: Maroon and light blue
- Song: Jerusalem
- Athletics: 20 interscholastic sports; 67 teams
- Mascot: the Hogger
- Rivals: Deerfield Academy
- Endowment: $185.9 million (June 30, 2023)
- Website: nmhschool.org

Northfield Mount Hermon School (NMH) is a co-educational college-preparatory school in Gill, Massachusetts. It educates boarding and day students in grades 9–12, as well as post-graduate students. It is a member of the Eight Schools Association.

== History ==
=== Egalitarian origins ===
In 1879, Northfield, Massachusetts native Dwight Lyman Moody (1837–99) established the Northfield Seminary for Young Ladies (renamed to the Northfield School for Girls in 1944) in his hometown. Two years later, he established a brother school, the Mount Hermon School for Boys, across the Connecticut River in Gill, Massachusetts. The schools were consolidated into a single non-profit corporation in 1912, but operated separately until 1971.

Moody initially envisioned the schools as a source of terminal education; in the early days, some of the students were in their thirties. The schools offered separate programs of study to accommodate their student body's varying goals. Each offered a college-preparatory course and a technical course. For a while, Mount Hermon also offered courses in agriculture and for future ministers. In the early days, most Mount Hermon students enrolled in the ministerial program, whose curriculum was designed to be sufficiently rigorous that a graduate could "enter the ministry or a related field without further formal education".

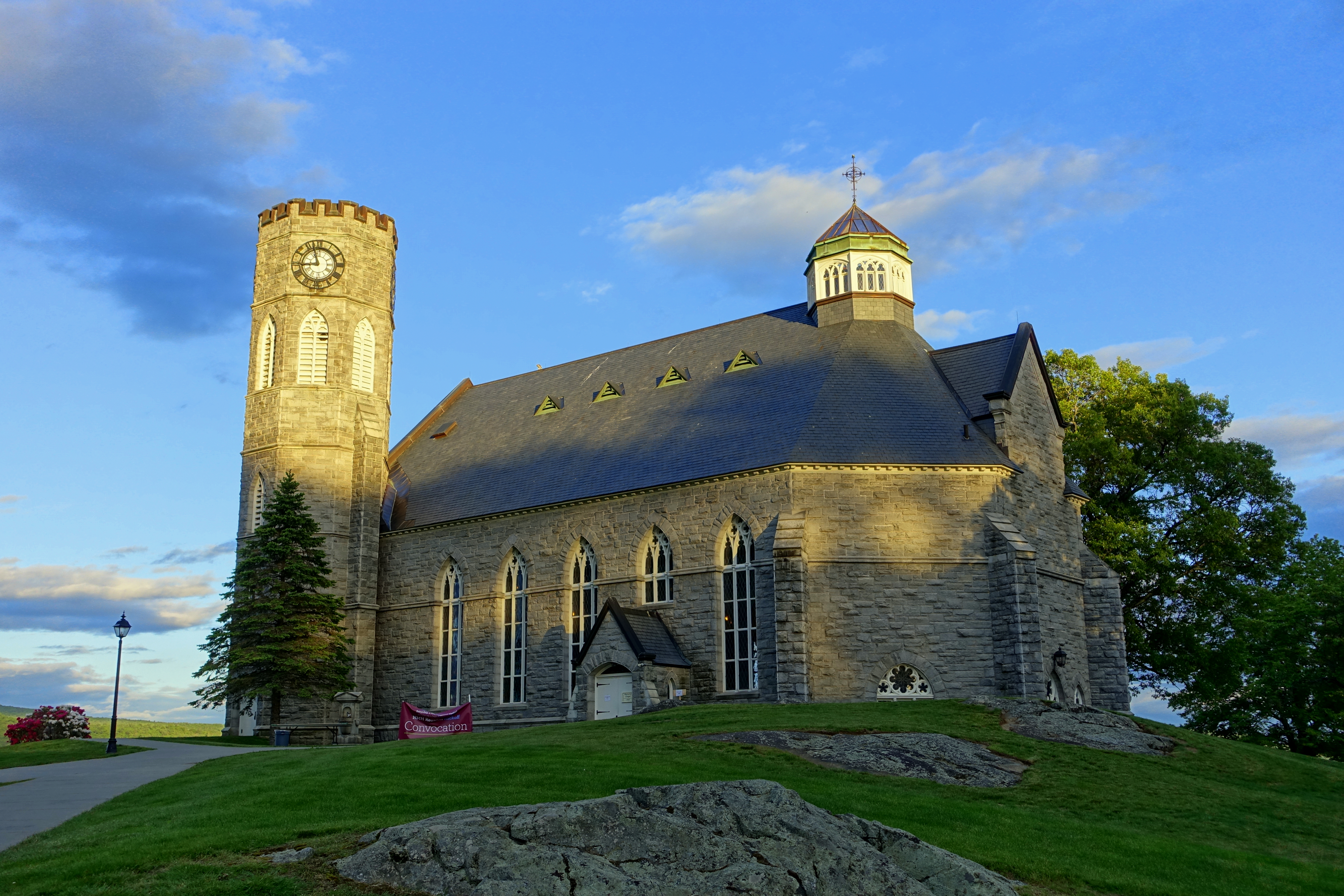
Memorial Chapel was featured in the film The Holdovers. Although the school was founded by a Christian preacher, NMH is now a secular institution. The chapel hosts a weekly interfaith all-school meeting.

An Evangelical preacher, Moody sought "to provide a Christian education for [students] of high purpose and limited means". The schools charged low tuition ($100/year in 1881) compared to other boarding schools and relied heavily on donations from Moody's followers. Through the 1920s, the rule was that "[n]o student was accepted if he could afford the fees of more expensive schools"; as a result, the students were "drawn largely from families at or near the poverty line", and, as late as 1914, a majority of male students at Mount Hermon had previously worked in an occupation or trade. In 1903 two-fifths of Northfield students did not live within commuting distance of a high school. Students would attend, drop out, and return based on the family's economic needs back home. In 1903, the schools reportedly enrolled 1,200 students and received at least four applicants for every vacancy.

On campus, the schools tended to provide a "community life of minimum expenditure". The schools operated a campus farm, and all students (both boys and girls) were required to perform some kind of labor to help fund the school's operations. Today, each student is still required to hold a job on campus, working three hours a week.

=== Evolution to nonsectarian college-preparatory school ===
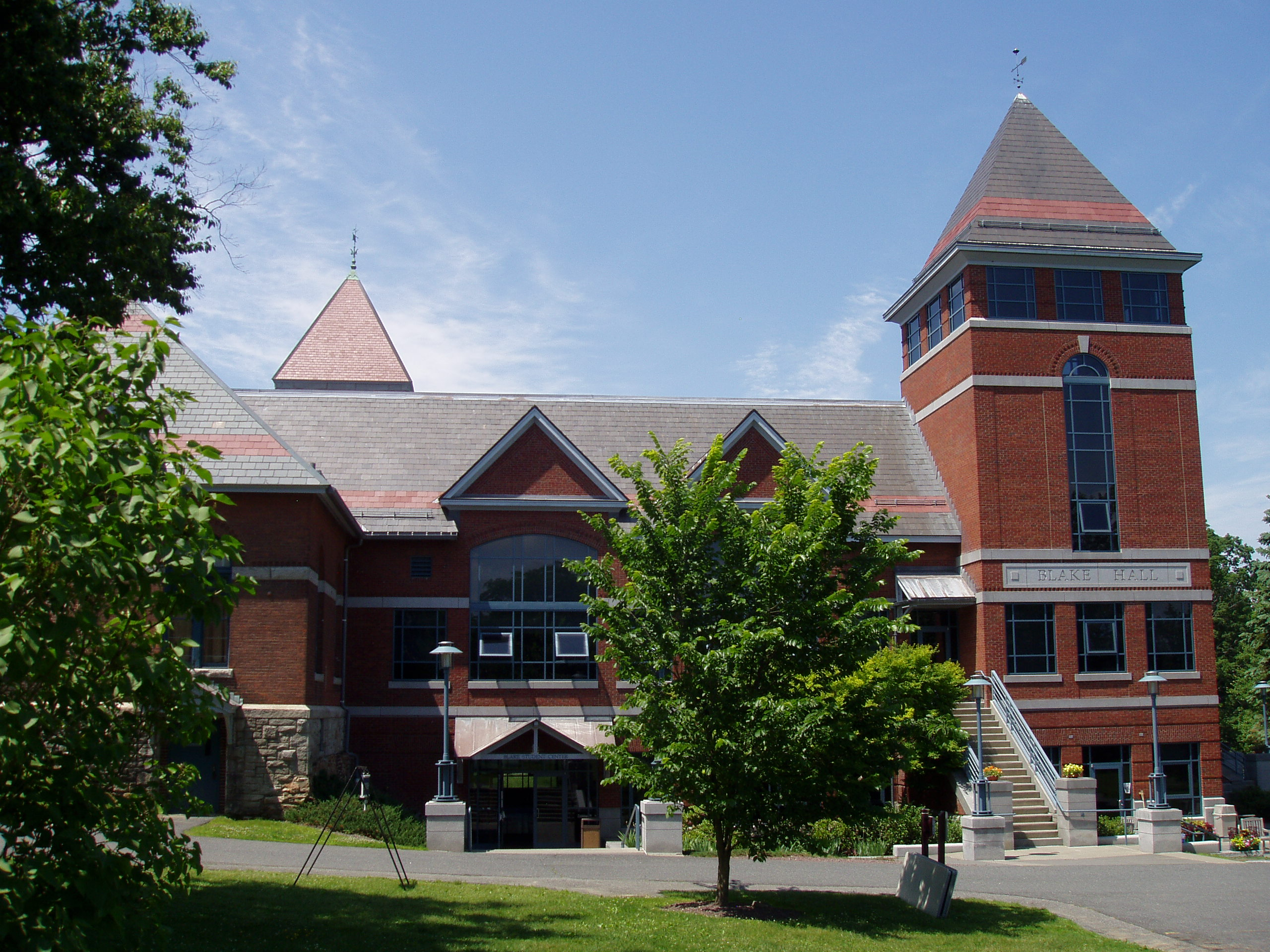
Blake Student Center was donated by alumnus S. Prestley Blake, the founder of Friendly's Ice Cream.

In the 1920s and 1930s, the Northfield schools shifted to a more conventional college-preparatory boarding school model. Enrollment remained high; by 1930, the schools' combined enrollment made the institution the largest private secondary school in the United States. Mount Hermon's ministerial curriculum was eliminated, and although a minority of Mount Hermon graduates went on to college during the Moody years, by the 1940s "virtually all [Mount Hermon boys] did so", as did half the girls at Northfield.

During the Great Depression, many Americans proved unable to pay even the Northfield schools' relatively low tuition fees. As such, the schools began accepting wealthy students in the 1930s. Tuition increased from $324 in 1929 to $2,600 by 1963, quadrupling in real terms. Nonetheless, the schools still educated large numbers of working- and middle-class students; in 1963, the school announced that it would double its financial aid budget, putting 60% of students on scholarship. The cost of providing a college-preparatory education has increased over time, and the school's reliance on wealthy students has increased accordingly. The percentage of scholarship students halved from 1963 to 2015.

The schools' ties to Evangelical Christianity weakened amidst the Fundamentalist-Modernist Controversy, and the schools eventually shifted to "a more liberal brand of Protestantism". Compulsory attendance at most Sunday chapel services was abolished in 1970.

=== Ethnic and regional diversity ===
Northfield Mount Hermon has a long tradition of educating minority and international students. (D. L. Moody was harshly criticized for his failure to oppose the emerging segregation movement when visiting the South in 1876; he founded Northfield Seminary three years later.)

As late as 1950, the Northfield schools were two of a handful of New England boarding schools admitting African-American students. One of Mount Hermon's first graduates, Thomas Nelson Baker Sr., was a freed slave who became the first African-American to obtain a PhD in philosophy in the United States. Several notable black lawyers attended the Northfield schools in the 1940s and 1950s, including judges William C. Pryor and Anna Diggs Taylor and civil rights attorney James Nabrit III, who argued (and won) Swann v. Charlotte-Mecklenburg Board of Education. In 1963, Mount Hermon's president pioneered a program to prepare black students to attend private schools, which developed into the A Better Chance program.

Sixteen of Northfield Seminary's first 100 students were Native Americans. In an era where the U.S. government sought to relocate Native Americans to federal boarding schools, Moody sought to train Native teachers who would return to their communities and open local schools. At Mount Hermon's first commencement in 1887, one student addressed the audience "in his native language, for the representatives of the Sioux, Shawnee, and Alaskan tribes in the school". Henry Roe Cloud, class of 1906, was the first Native American to graduate from Yale. The Athabascan Walter Harper attended the school in the 1900s after becoming the first man to summit Denali. In the 1970s and 1980s, the school educated two of "the first Navajos to matriculate at Princeton".

The Northfield schools were also reputed for their openness to international students, many of whom were referred to the schools by American missionaries. They have educated students from Asia since at least 1886; and Chan Loon Teung, class of 1892, was Harvard's first Chinese graduate. Pixley Seme, the founder and president of the African National Congress, graduated from NMH in 1902. In 1889, Mount Hermon enrolled 37 international students from 15 countries, mostly Canada and the British Isles; three students came from East Asia, three from Turkey, and one from Africa. In 1904, it enrolled 113 international students from 27 countries, including 14 from Asia.

=== 21st-century downsizing and reorientation ===
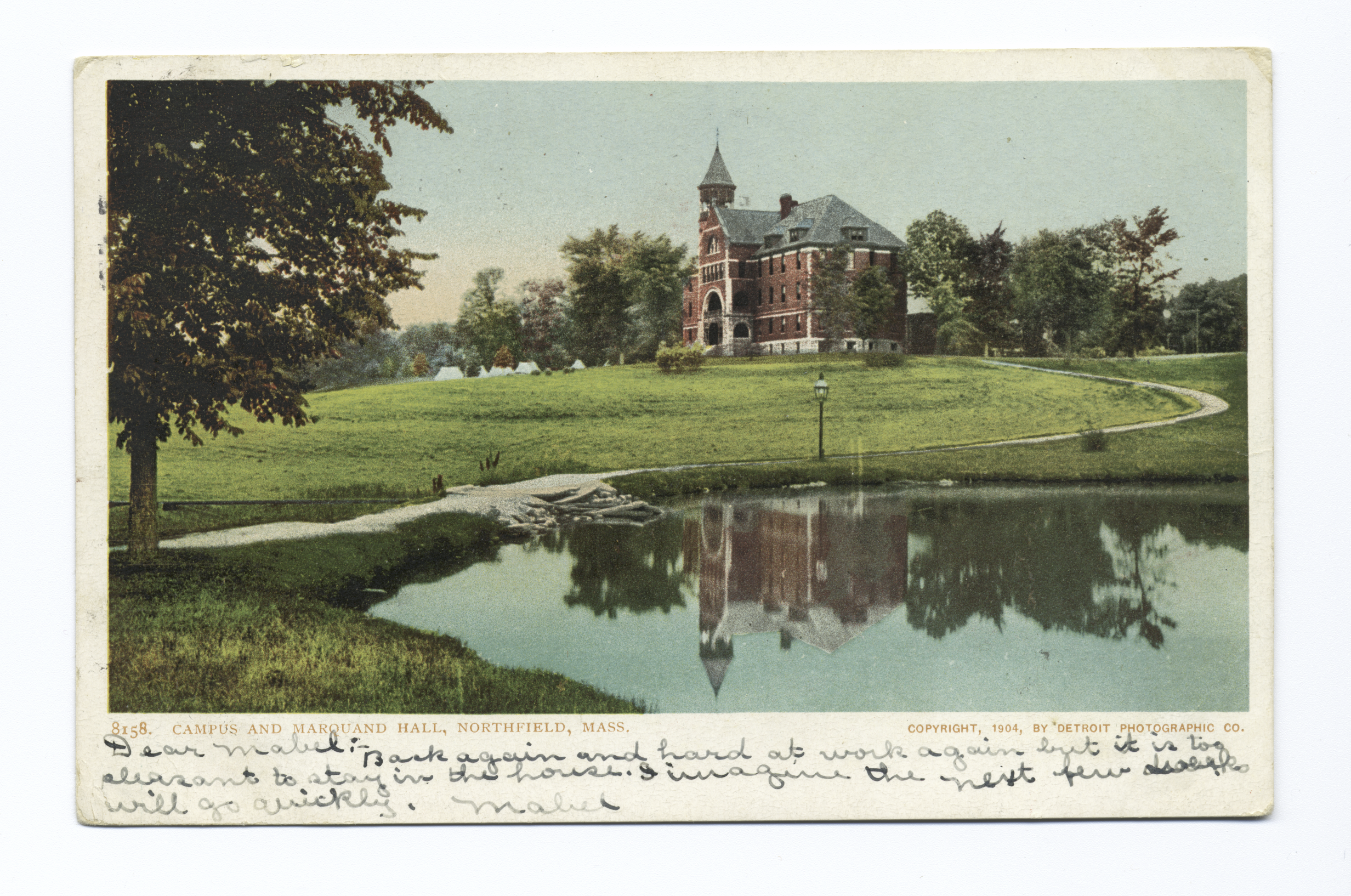
Northfield Seminary's Marquand Hall (pictured in 1904) is now part of Thomas Aquinas College's Northfield campus.

From 2004 to 2005, NMH closed its Northfield campus and announced that it would halve its enrollment. The school explained that it wanted to reduce its high operating costs, including faculty salaries and the expenses of running two campuses. It sold Northfield's academic core in 2009 and the surrounding grounds in 2016. Since 2019, Northfield has hosted a satellite campus of California-based Catholic liberal arts college Thomas Aquinas College.

Since the downsizing, NMH's faculty and student body have shrunk, but the share of students on financial aid has not increased. In 2003, NMH educated 1,124 students, 42% of whom were on financial aid. In the 2023–24 school year, the school enrolled 630 students, 37% of whom were on financial aid. The student-teacher ratio remained constant at 6:1. In the 2023–24 school year, 23% of the student body came from abroad, and 33% of the American students (25.4% of the student body) identified as people of color.

In 2025, NMH began a fundraising campaign aiming to raise $275 million, including $75 million for financial aid, $25 million for faculty salaries, and $70 million for facility improvements. The campaign was supported by the largest gift in school history, from a former Mount Hermon valedictorian and scholarship student.

== In popular culture ==
The school was a major filming location for Alexander Payne's 2023 film The Holdovers, standing in for the fictional Barton Academy.

== Tuition ==
=== Tuition and financial aid ===
In the 2023–24 school year, NMH charged boarding students $72,647 and day students $48,302, plus other mandatory and optional fees. International students were charged an additional $3,345.

37% of the student body is on financial aid, which covers, on average, $56,314 (77.5% of tuition) for boarding students and $34,361 (71.1% of tuition) for day students. The school commits to meet 100% of an admitted student's demonstrated financial need.

=== Endowment and expenses ===
NMH's financial endowment stood at $185.9 million as of June 30, 2023. In its Internal Revenue Service filings for the 2021–22 school year, NMH reported total assets of $311.8 million, net assets of $212.4 million, investment holdings of $178.0 million, and cash holdings of $23.3 million. NMH also reported $36.7 million in program service expenses and $9.1 million in grants (primarily student financial aid).

== Athletics ==
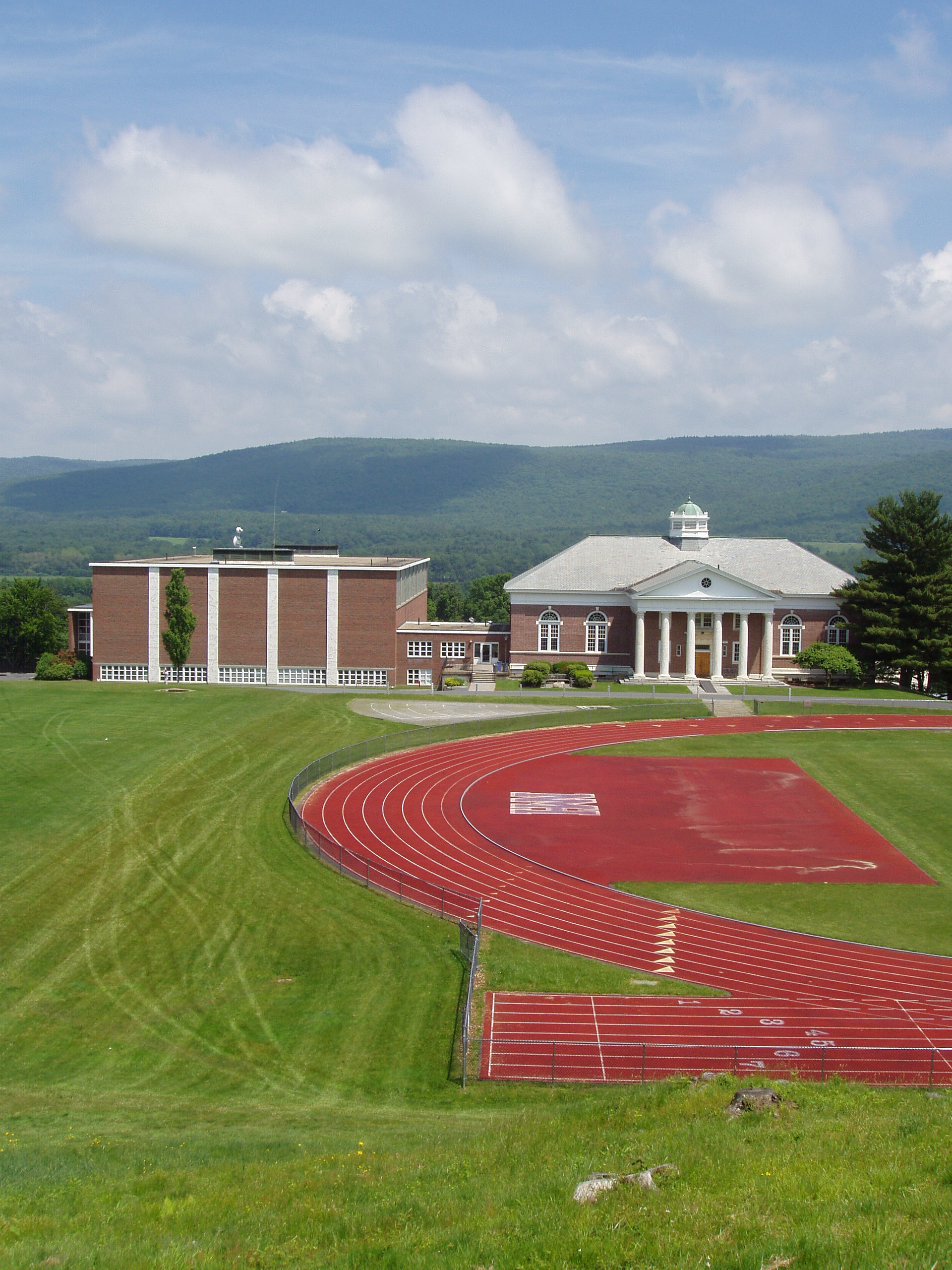
James and Forslund Gymnasiums

NMH has one of the strongest athletic programs in New England. Notable teams include boys' basketball (2013 national title, 4 New England titles), boys' cross country (27 New England titles), track and field (8 New England titles), boys' soccer (7 New England titles, the most of any school), girls' volleyball (7 New England titles), girls' basketball (5 New England titles), wrestling (5 New England titles), and girls' alpine skiing (3 New England titles).

In recent years, NMH's postgraduate program has become a popular option for students seeking to bolster their academic and athletic resumes before applying to college. In 2014, the Harvard Crimson wrote that NMH "has become the standard layover destination for [postgraduate basketball] players in the Ivy League." (The previous year, 47.7% of Ivy League men's basketball players had prep school experience.)

William G. Morgan, the inventor of volleyball, graduated from Mount Hermon in 1893. NMH also claims to have invented the sport of ultimate frisbee in 1968.

== Arts programs ==
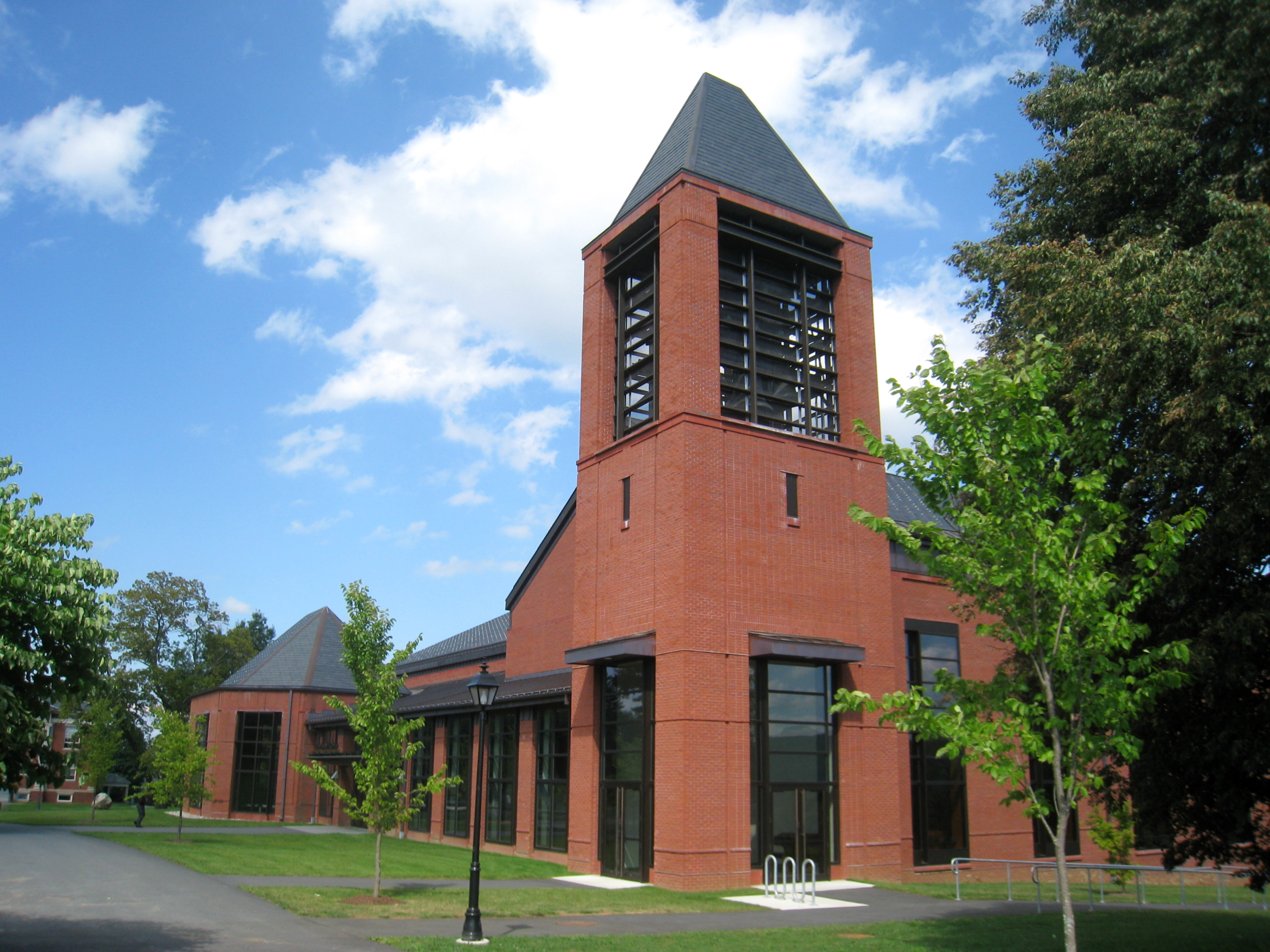
The Rhodes Arts Center opened in 2008.

The Rhodes Arts Center houses a concert hall, a black-box theater, and art and music rehearsal spaces and practice rooms.

Memorial Chapel houses a 2-manual 27-stop, 37-rank tracker organ with a pedal compass of 30, and a manual compass of 56.

== Notable alumni ==
- S. Prestley Blake, 1934, founder of Friendly's Ice Cream
- Aurelia E. Brazeal, 1962, diplomat
- Natalie Cole, 1968, singer, songwriter, and actress
- Misha Collins, actor
- Belle da Costa Greene, 1899, founding director of the Morgan Library & Museum
- Bette Davis, 1927, Academy Award-winning actor
- Lawrence Ferlinghetti, 1937, poet, painter, and activistt
- Juliana Force, 1900, founding director of the Whitney Museum of Art
- Lee de Forest, 1893, radio pioneer; inventor of the first commercially practical vacuum tube
- Henry Kempton Craft 1902, civil rights leader and YMCA executive
- Tessa Gobbo, 2009, Olympic gold medalist rower
- Dore Gold, 1971, American-born Israeli political scientist and diplomat
- David Hartman, 1952, host of Good Morning America
- Sirena Irwin, 1988, voice director and voice actress
- Valerie Jarrett, 1974, senior advisor to U.S. President Barack Obama
- June Jordan, 1953, poet and essayist
- Julia Kirtland, 1983, distance runner
- Nate Laszewski, 2018, basketball player in the Israeli Basketball Premier League
- Chris Ledlum, professional basketball player
- Laura Linney, 1982, Emmy and SAG Award-winning actor
- James W. McLamore, 1943, founder of Burger King
- Tad Mosel, 1940, Pulitzer Prize-winning playwright
- Elizabeth Perkins, 1978, actor
- Mike Pieciak, 2002, politician
- Pixley Seme, 1902, founder of the African National Congress
- Arn Chorn-Pond, 1986, Cambodian musician, human rights activist
- William R. Rhodes, 1953, CEO of Citibank
- J. Stapleton Roy, 1952, former U.S. ambassador to Singapore, Indonesia, and People’s Republic of China
- Edward W. Said, 1953, literary critic and activist
- Neil Sheehan, 1954, Pulitzer Prize-winning journalist (Pentagon Papers)
- Frank Shorter, 1965, Olympic gold medalist marathoner
- Whitney Tilson, 1985, hedge fund manager, philanthropist, author, and Democratic political activist
- Uma Thurman, 1988, actress
- Yasmin Vossoughian, 1996, national TV journalist
- Bisa Williams, 1972, former U.S. ambassador to Niger
- Danny Wolf, 2022, American-Israeli NBA player for the Brooklyn Nets
