= Falco, Alabama =

Unincorporated community in Covington County, Alabama, United States

- Unincorporated community
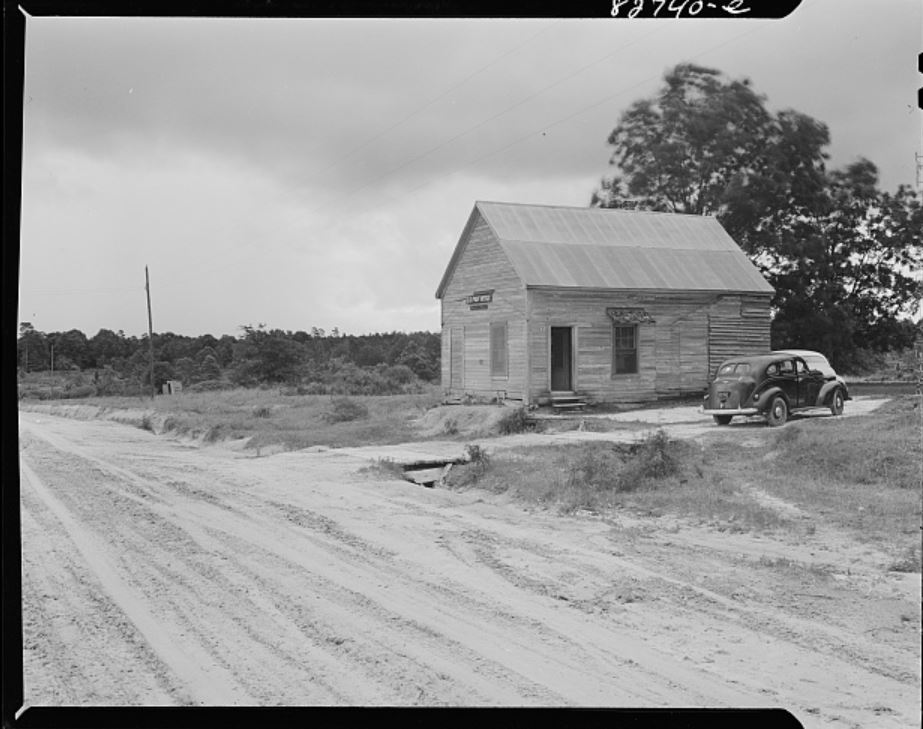
- Falco post office in 1942
- Nickname(s): Falco, Florida
- Location within Alabama Location within the United States
- Coordinates: 31°02′57″N 86°37′06″W
- Country: United States
- State: Alabama
- County: Covington
- Elevation: 243 ft (74 m)
- Time zone: UTC-6 (Central (CST))
  - Summer (DST): UTC-5 (CDT)
- ZIP code: 36483
- Area code: 334
- GNIS feature ID: 118171

Falco is an unincorporated community in Covington County, Alabama, United States. The community lies adjacent to the Conecuh National Forest.

== Name ==
The community's name is an acronym for the Florida-Alabama Land Company, which harvested timber in the area.

== History ==
Falco was founded by members of the Florida-Alabama Land Company in 1903. The community was home to a large sawmill, the Falco Bank, Falcola Bottling Company, a 40-room hotel, a grist mill and general stores. A two-story railroad depot sat near the logging railroads, which connected at Galliver, FL to the Central of Georgia and L&N lines.

The town began to decline after a fire destroyed the saw mill in 1925. The mill was then moved to Willow, Florida. The hotel was moved to Opp, AL. A post office operated under the name Falco from 1903 to 1955.

Falco was photographed by John Collier Jr., who was working for the Farm Security Administration under Roy Stryker.

== Demographics ==
Falco was listed as an incorporated community on the U.S. Census from 1920 to 1940.

Historical population
Census	Pop.	Note	%±
1920	592		—
1930	96		−83.8%
1940	80		−16.7%
U.S. Decennial Census

== Notable person ==
- Emory Williams, businessman and entrepreneur
