= John M. Maguire =

American businessman and restaurateur

- Born: John Maquire circa 1966; Weymouth, Massachusetts
- Education: Bachelor’s degree in bakery science and management, Kansas State University, 1987; master’s degree in advanced management, Harvard Business School, 2011
- Occupation: 2012, CEO, Friendly's

John M. Maguire is an American businessman and restaurateur, and the former president and CEO of Friendly's, a position he from April 12, 2012.

Maguire brought two decades of experience in restaurant operations, most recently as Executive Vice President and Chief Operating Officer of Panera Bread. Maguire previously held positions with Au Bon Pain Co., Inc., Bread and Circus/Whole Foods Supermarkets, and Continental Baking Company.

== Early life and education ==
Maguire is a native of South Weymouth, Massachusetts. He has a bachelor's degree in bakery science and management from Kansas State University, 1987 and a master's degree in advanced management from Harvard Business School, 2011.

== Career ==
When Maguire was 26, Au Bon Pain handed him "his first chance to turn around an operation. The project was a 17,000-square-foot commissary in a building under the Tobin Bridge charged with providing salads, juice, and baked goods to the Au Bon Pain locations without their own kitchens. The commissary was a disaster." The lesson he learned there about motivating his employees is one he has intended to take to Friendly's.

According to Bloomberg Business Week, Maguire was "Chief Operating Officer at Panera Bread Co. (also known as Au Bon Pain Co., Inc.) from March 2008 to April 2012 and as its Executive Vice President since April 3, 2006. He joined Panera Bread Co. in April 1993 and served as Chief Company and Joint Venture Operations Officer since November 2002; Senior Vice President from November 2002 to April 3, 2006; Senior Vice President of Company Operations and Bakery Supply Chain from April 2000 to July 2001 and Vice President of Commissary Operations from November 1998 to March 2000. From January 1990 to October 1998, Mr. Maguire served as a Manager and Vice President of Commissary Operations for the Au Bon Pain and Panera Bread/ Saint Louis Bread Divisions and a Director at Panera Bread Co."

In February 2012, Friendly's CEO Harsha V. Agadi announced his resignation. This came four months after Friendly's filed for Chapter 11 Bankruptcy protection. On April 12, 2012, Friendly's announced that John Maguire had been named president and CEO. On September 12, 2018, Maguire announced his departure from Friendly's.
