= Emory Williams =

American businessman (1911–2014)

- Born: October 26, 1911; Falco, Alabama, U.S.
- Died: February 11, 2014 (aged 102); Hobe Sound, Florida, U.S.
- Education: Emory University
- Occupation(s): Corporate executive and civic leader
- Spouse: Janet Williams
- Children: Nelle, Janet, Bliss, Carol, and Emory, Jr.

Emory Williams, Sr. (October 26, 1911 – February 11, 2014) was an American businessman and entrepreneur. He was the chief financial officer of Sears Roebuck during the 1960s, when Sears was the largest retailer in the world. He went on to become president and chairman of the Sears Bank, a Chicago lender (later acquired by Old Kent Bank), and the president and chairman of Chicago Milwaukee Corp, a railroad and real estate company, before setting up manufacturing businesses in China in the 1990s.

== Early life ==
Williams was born in Falco, Alabama, and grew up in Quitman, Mississippi. He was a member of the graduating class of 1932 from Emory University, where there is now a teaching award for academic excellence that bears his name. During World War II, Williams was primarily based in the South-East Asian theatre of World War II, working under Supreme Allied Commander for South East Asia Lord Louis Mountbatten.

== Career ==
Williams served as a Director of the following New York Stock Exchange companies:

- Armstrong Rubber Co. (acquired by Mark IV Industries)
- Roper Corporation (acquired by General Electric Co.)
- General Portland Cement Co. (acquired by Lafarge)
- V.S.I. Corporation
- Ft. Dearborn Income Securities (NYSE: FDI)
- Chicago Milwaukee Corp. (acquired by Canadian National Railway)
- Foote, Cone, Belding Communications, Inc. (acquired by Interpublic Cos.)
- Bobbie Brooks, Inc.

Williams served as the President of the Chicago Crusade of Mercy (United Way), President and Life Trustee of the Adler Planetarium, President and Life Trustee of the Ravinia Festival Association, President of the Chicago Community Fund, Chairman of the Illinois Health Education Commission, Chairman-Finance of the Northwestern Memorial Hospital, Trustee of the Charles W. Kellstadt Foundation and as a Life Trustee of Emory University. He established the Emory Williams Awards for Excellence in Teaching at Emory University and at the University of Chicago Graduate School of Business.

== Later life ==
Williams lived in Wilmette, Illinois and Loblolly Bay, a private club in Hobe Sound, Florida that he cofounded in 1979. The youngest of his five children, Emory Williams, Jr., has lived and worked in China since the 1990s and is a member of Young Presidents' Organization and has also chaired the American Chamber of Commerce in China (AmCham China). His grandchildren include Olympic oarsman Jamie Schroeder. He turned 100 in October 2011 and died in February 2014 at the age of 102.

== See also ==
- List of centenarians (businesspeople)
