= August Walle-Hansen =

Norwegian businessman

August Walle-Hansen (16 January 1877 – 1964) was a Norwegian businessperson.

After middle school and commerce school, he was hired in the family company Brødrene Hansen in 1893. He was a son of Jørgen Hansen, who had founded the company together with two brothers in 1864. August's brother Thomas Walle-Hansen was also hired.

He was a board member of Forsikringsselskapet Viking and supervisory council member of Den norske Creditbank, Grand Hotel and Norsk Hotelcompagnie. He was a member of the gentlemen's skiing club SK Fram from 1891, and received honorary membership in 1964. He died later the same year.
