= Monticello replicas =

List of replicas of Thomas Jefferson's house

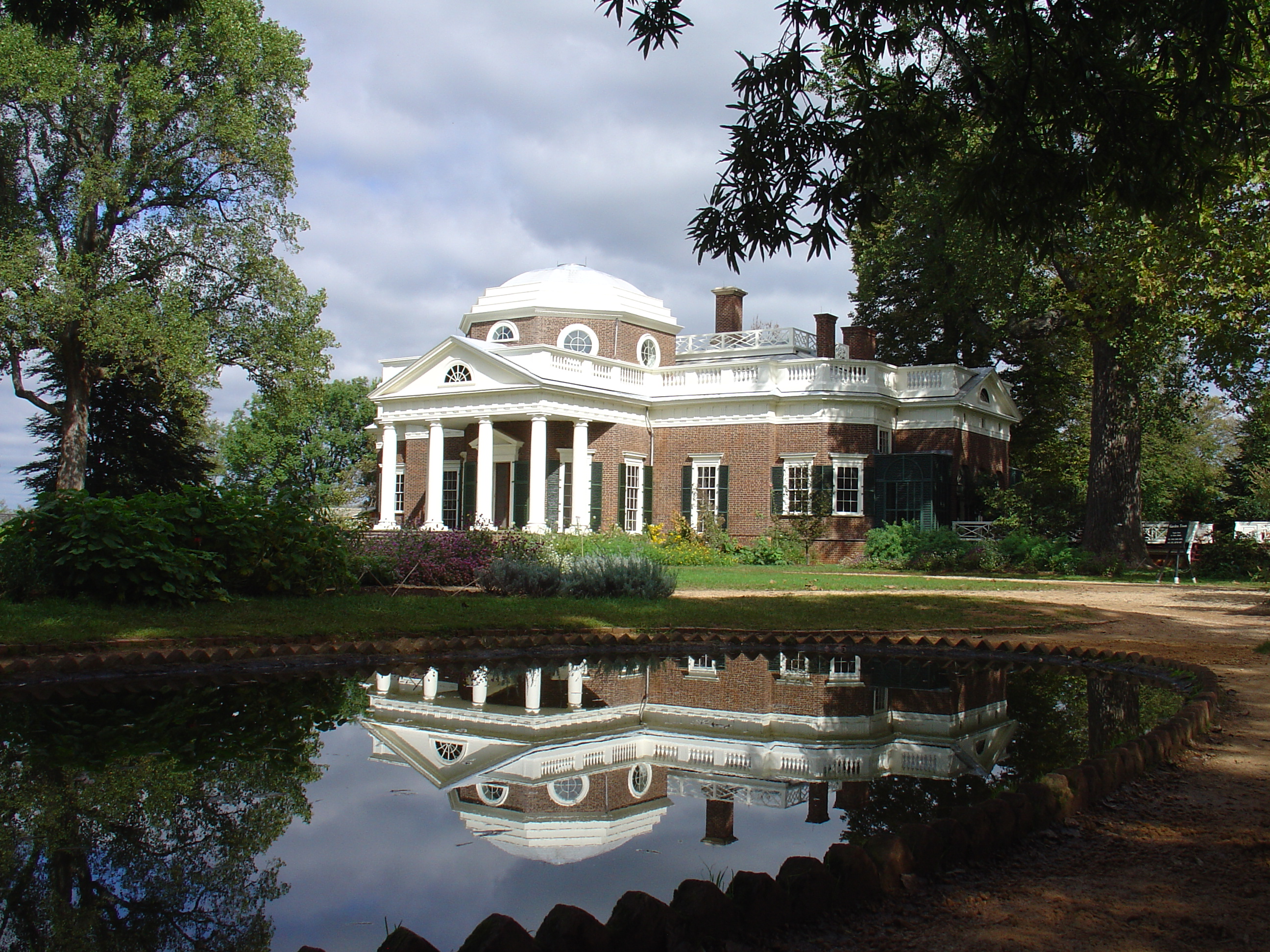
The original Monticello, pictured here, has inspired hundreds of replicas.

Monticello, the Albemarle County, Virginia, plantation home of U.S. President Thomas Jefferson, has inspired hundreds of replica buildings. These buildings, built across the United States, have included private residences, museums, academic buildings and banks. At one point, the Jefferson Library near Charlottesville maintained a file dating back to the 1960s documenting the replicas.

Designed by Jefferson himself based on his exposure to classical architecture during his diplomatic service in Europe, and rebuilt in its current form between 1796 and 1809, Monticello is considered a major architectural landmark. It is listed as a National Historic Landmark and is the only U.S. presidential home to be listed as a UNESCO World Heritage Site.

However, Monticello replicas have received negative critical appraisal. A former curator of Ash Lawn–Highland, a home of James Monroe located near Monticello, described them as having "an intrinsic lack of subtlety and a fondness for pretension." The Thomas Jefferson Foundation, which owns and operates Monticello, has looked with skepticism on replica projects. Bill Beiswanger, then-director of restoration at Monticello, said in 2003 that Jefferson would be "rather aghast" at the prevalence of replicas. One replica builder in Washington state sought plans for Monticello from the foundation, and not receiving them, toured the house with a tape measure but was stopped from using it by security guards. However, when Friendly's founder S. Prestley Blake was planning his Monticello replica in Connecticut, Monticello officials spent six hours meeting with his builders and answering their questions.

== List of documented permanent replicas ==
Name	Location	State	Image	Year completed	Notes	Coordinates
Monticello Vineyards	Napa	California		1984	This one-third scale replica was built as the administration building for Monticello Vineyards by owner John Jay Corley, a Jefferson admirer.	38.3614°N 122.3057°W
Blake Center for Faith and Freedom, Hillsdale College	Somers	Connecticut		2014	This replica was built by Friendly's founder and Jefferson devotee S. Prestley Blake and his wife, Helen. It was completed in 2014, when Blake was 100. The 10,000-square-foot (930 m^{2}) building is a perfect replica from the front and includes a three-car garage in the rear. Blake spent $7.7 million to build it, but sold it at auction two years later for $2.1 million. Blake, who lived nearby, never moved into the house but held functions there. In 2019, Blake donated $25 million, along with his nearby estate, to Michigan-based Hillsdale College. Hillsdale in turn used $4.85 million to buy three other adjoining properties, including spending $3 million to buy the Monticello replica from the private owner. The college's 2019 land-use plans for the 100-acre (40 ha) campus, to be called the Blake Center for Faith and Freedom, would focus on seminars and lectures related to Christianity, with a full-time chaplain and chapel on site. The first chaplain and executive director of the Blake Center was Anglican priest Alan Crippen. The first floor of the Monticello replica is used for events, while the second floor provides four suites for guest speakers.	42.0337°N 72.4896°W
Former Integra Bank branch	Huntingburg	Indiana			Sold following the failure of Integra Bank; no longer a bank.	38.3116°N 86.9559°W
First National Bank of Monticello	Monticello	Indiana		1975	Built as the headquarters of the First National Bank of Monticello following the 1974 destruction of its office at 116 East Washington Street in a tornado. The design was inspired both by the name of the town and the 1976 United States Bicentennial. The branch location was purchased by National City Bank, then Lafayette Bank & Trust in 1996 and ultimately First Merchants Bank in 2009.	40.7463°N 86.7609°W
Paducah Replica	Paducah	Kentucky			Engineered by Henry Maxwell Lummis.	37.0548°N 88.6454°W
Ward and Regina Correll Science Complex, University of the Cumberlands	Williamsburg	Kentucky		2007	Built with a $1 million donation from Ward Correll, the 28,000-square-foot (2,600 m^{2}) building includes classrooms, labs and a 134-seat seminar room.	36.7368°N 84.1610°W
Chamberlain Hall, Wilbraham & Monson Academy	Wilbraham	Massachusetts		1997	The 1962 Chamberlain Hall, home to W&M Academy's middle school, was expanded with a building based on Monticello. It was built with a $1 million gift from S. Prestley Blake, for whom the middle school was subsequently named, and opened in 1997.	42.1237°N 72.4326°W
Pi Kappa Alpha Memorial Headquarters	Memphis	Tennessee		1988	Built in the Southwind development and dedicated during the 1988 Memphis Pi Kappa Alpha convention with nearly 1,000 members in attendance. The building included larger museum exhibit and archival capacity.	35.0554°N 89.7848°W
Wings of a Dove Museum at Trinity Music City	Hendersonville	Tennessee		1984	This building was opened in 1984 as Ferlin Husky's Wings of a Dove Museum, part of Conway Twitty's tourism complex. Later became part of the Trinity Broadcasting Network's Nashville-area campus.	36.3229°N 86.5653°W
Jim and Sally Nation Hall, Dallas Baptist University	Dallas	Texas		2015	A 23,000-square-foot (2,100 m^{2}) replica at a slightly larger scale, Nation Hall houses Dallas Baptist University's Gary Cook School of Leadership as well as the office's of the university's president and chancellor.	32.7095°N 96.9483°W
Prosperity Bank Sugar Land Banking Center	Sugar Land	Texas		1999	Built as the headquarters of Southern National Bank prior to its acquisition by Prosperity Bancshares, this 15,100-square-foot (1,400 m^{2}) building is part of a corporate campus that includes replicas of Poplar Forest and the Lawn at the University of Virginia.	29.6192°N 95.6055°W
Zeta Psi Fraternity House, University of Virginia	Charlottesville	Virginia		1926	Designed by Louis F. Voorhees in 1924 and completed in 1926, includes a portico that is an exact replica of the one Jefferson designed for Monticello prior to 1772.	38.0391°N 78.5025°W
St. Paul's Baptist Church South	Richmond	Virginia		1972	The $670,000 sanctuary and Monticello-inspired entrance complex was completed in 1972 for Weatherford Memorial Baptist Church. Following decades of membership declines, in 2005 the congregation voted to disband and donate its building to the predominantly African-American St. Paul's Baptist Church, which operates the former Weatherford building as a satellite campus.	37.5014°N 77.4737°W
Monticello West	Ford	Washington		c. 2020	Built between 2001 and roughly 2020 by (and to a design by) retired Eastern Washington University professor Dan Sisson. Construction used foraged, salvaged and secondhand materials, including more than 22,000 used bricks.	47.8804°N 117.8469°W

== Temporary replicas ==
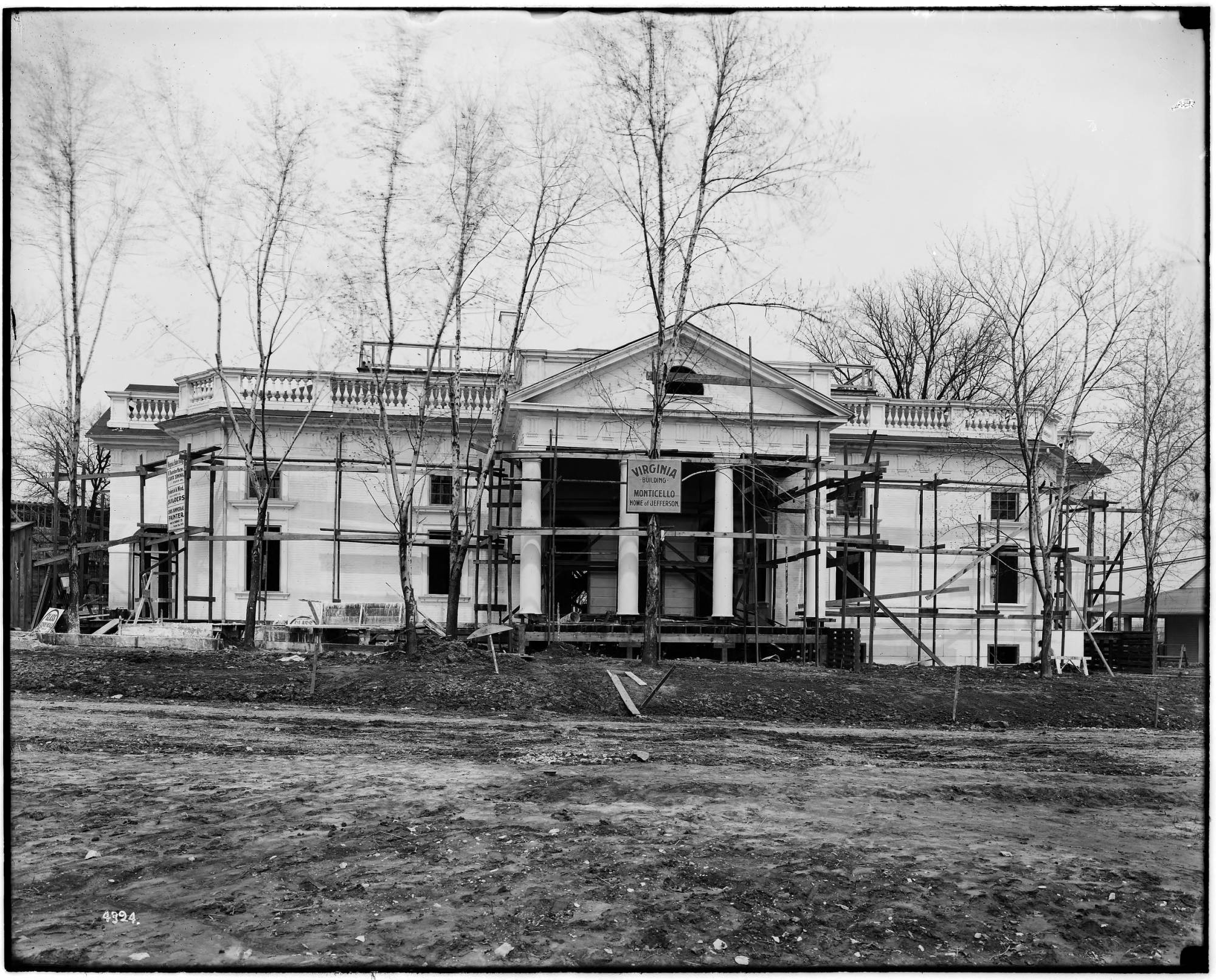
The Virginia pavilion at the Louisiana Purchase Exposition, a replica of Monticello, under construction in 1904

With $60,000 in state funding, a temporary Monticello reproduction was erected as Virginia's state pavilion at the Louisiana Purchase Exposition, also known as the St. Louis World's Fair. The pavilion was open from May through September 1904. The pavilion displays included a life-size statue of Jefferson, the table on which Jefferson drafted the United States Declaration of Independence and the chair Jefferson used to preside over the United States Senate as vice president.

For the first inauguration of Woodrow Wilson in 1913, a temporary replica of Monticello's portico was erected in front of the White House to serve as the president's viewing stand for the inaugural parade. The selection of Monticello as a design motif was attributed to Wilson's desire for simplicity in inaugural trappings.

== Planned replica ==
In the 1930s, the U.S. ambassador to the Soviet Union, William Christian Bullitt Jr., planned to build a Monticello replica to serve as the U.S. Embassy in Moscow. These plans were not seen to completion.
