= Ebby Halliday =

American businesswoman

- Born: Vera Lucille Koch; March 9, 1911; Leslie, Arkansas, U.S.
- Died: September 8, 2015 (aged 104); Dallas, Texas, U.S.
- Occupation: Real Estate Entrepreneur

Ebby Halliday (born Vera Lucille Koch; March 9, 1911 – September 8, 2015) was an American realtor and businesswoman who founded Ebby Halliday Realtors.

She was one of the first successful female entrepreneurs in Dallas and is recognized as the "First Lady of Real Estate". John S. Baen, a professor of real estate at the University of North Texas in Denton comments, ''she was the first woman to enter what was a chauvinistic profession in a macho state'' and that ''she beat those ol' boys at their own game.''

Halliday was born in Leslie, Arkansas, and graduated from high school in Abilene, Kansas, in 1929. She got a $10-a-week job selling women's hats at The Jones Store in Kansas City. In less than a year, she was the top salesperson. In 1938, she was asked to take over the millinery department at Dallas' W.A. Green Store. Soon she had her own Dallas boutique, Ebby's Hats. She founded her real estate company in 1945.

Halliday married former FBI agent Maurice Acers in 1965. Maurice Acers died in 1993. She celebrated her 100th birthday on March 9, 2011. She died at the age of 104 on September 8, 2015, in her sleep, with her friends and family by her side.

== Awards ==
Halliday was awarded the H. Neil Mallon Award by the World Affairs Council in 1989. The H. Neil Mallon Award, hosted by the World Affair Council of Dallas/ Fort Worth, is presented annually to individuals who have excelled at promoting the international focus of North Texas. The prestigious Mallon Award is named after the Council’s founder and is presented annually to individuals who have excelled in promoting our region’s international profile. Funds raised from this event support the World Affair Council’s public and education programming, international exchanges, and diplomatic services.

Halliday received the Horatio Alger Award in 2005.

== See also ==
- List of centenarians (businesspeople)
