= Curtis Blake =

American businessman and philanthropist (1917–2019)

- Born: Curtis Livingston Blake; April 15, 1917; Jersey City, New Jersey, U.S.
- Died: May 24, 2019 (aged 102); Hobe Sound, Florida, U.S.
- Occupations: Businessman and philanthropist
- Years active: 1935–1979
- Known for: Co-founder of the Friendly Ice Cream Corporation
- Relatives: S. Prestley Blake (brother)

Curtis Livingston Blake (April 15, 1917 – May 24, 2019) was an American businessman and philanthropist.

== Biography ==
Born in Jersey City, New Jersey, to Herbert Prestley Blake and Ethel Stewart Blake, Curtis and his elder brother, Stewart Prestley Blake (known as "S. Prestley Blake"), jointly founded the Friendly Ice Cream Corporation (later known more commonly as "Friendly's"). Their first restaurant opened in 1935, during the Great Depression, in Massachusetts. By the 1970s, the brothers began to fight over the direction of the business. The company was sold to Hershey Foods in 1979 for $164 million.

Under Hershey Foods, Friendly's grew to more than 800 eateries, the highest number in its history. But the chain began to flounder because of high labor costs and intense competition. Donald Smith, a veteran restaurant executive, bought Friendly's for $375 million in 1988. Most analysts believed he paid far too much for the struggling firm, strapping the company with a huge debt.

Blake died on May 24, 2019, in Hobe Sound, Florida, at the age of 102.

== Other ==
A former patron and benefactor of the Springfield, Massachusetts-based American International College, Blake asked that his name be removed from the school's campus following the decision by the AIC to close the off-campus Curtis Blake Day School in June 2015 for 37 students with language-learning disabilities, reportedly due to declining enrollment. The Children's Study Home Students, also of Springfield, stepped in to provide for the children, who would otherwise have been displaced.
