= S. Prestley Blake =

American businessman (1914–2021)

- Born: Stewart Prestley Blake; November 26, 1914; Jersey City, New Jersey, U.S.
- Died: February 11, 2021 (aged 106); Stuart, Florida, U.S.
- Occupation: Restaurateur
- Years active: 1935–1979
- Known for: Co-founder of the Friendly Ice Cream Corporation
- Relatives: Curtis Blake (brother)

Stewart Prestley Blake (November 26, 1914 – February 11, 2021) was an American restaurateur. He was a co-founder of the Friendly Ice Cream Corporation (known more commonly as "Friendly's").

== Early life ==
Blake was born in Jersey City, New Jersey, on November 26, 1914. He had two brothers (Curtis Blake and Hollis, who died at the age of two) and one sister (Betsy Melvin). Their father, Herbert Prestley Blake, was employed by Standard Electric Time Company; their mother, Ethel (Stewart) Blake, was a car enthusiast who inspired her sons' interest in vehicles. Blake was raised in Springfield, Massachusetts, and attended Northfield Mount Hermon School. He went on to study at Trinity College in Hartford, Connecticut. However, he dropped out after one year and moved back to Springfield in order to start Friendly's with his brother Curtis.

== Career ==
Blake and Curtis founded the Friendly's national restaurant chain in the summer of 1935, during the Great Depression. They worked closely together for 43 years. From making ice cream to scooping ice cream, the brothers shared in the hard work of getting the company off the ground; even their mother chipped in, helping to create the syrup for the coffee flavored ice cream. Blake was chairman of the company until 1979, when he sold it to The Hershey Company for approximately US$164 million. It was sold once more, in 1988 to entrepreneur Donald N. Smith for US$375 million. The company's name was shortened to simply "Friendly's". The signature beverage was the "Fribble", also known as the Awful Awful.

Blake continued to own shares in Friendly's, but took a hands-off approach with regard to its corporate affairs. However, the company's significant debt load at the end of the 1990s, coupled with what he regarded as poor management, led him to purchase shares in the company that resulted in his becoming the largest shareholder (with a 12% stake). He came into conflict with Smith about the direction of Friendly's and feuded with him publicly. At one point, Blake and his brother were not on speaking terms, and Curtis even blamed Blake for meddling in the company's affairs in an opinion piece in The Republican. The two brothers ultimately reconciled before Curtis' death in 2019.

In 1980, Blake earned a PhD at Western New England College, and one in 1982 at Springfield College. He held honorary PhD degrees from Bay Path College, Quinnipiac College, and Elms College. In 2006, he was a minority shareholder in Friendly's. On May 1, 2011, Brigantine Media published Blake's autobiography, A Friendly Life, which describes the early years of Friendly Ice Cream Company as well as Blake's shareholder suit.

=== Philanthropy ===
The S. Prestley Blake Law Center is the home of Western New England University's School of Law (he had donated $250,000 for it in 1979). The Blake Student Center at Northfield Mount Hermon School is also named after him. He donated $2 million to Springfield College in 2006 and had Wilbraham Hall renamed as Herbert P. Blake Hall in honor of his father.

Blake celebrated his centenary in 2014 by constructing a copy of Monticello to modern-day standards in Somers, Connecticut. It was auctioned two years later for approximately US$2.1 million. He donated his other property in Somers to Hillsdale College in Hillsdale, Michigan. The college in turn created the Blake Center for Faith and Freedom.

== Personal life ==
Blake's first marriage was to Della Deming. Together, they had two children: Benson P. Blake and Nancy Yanakakis. They later divorced, and his subsequent marriage to Setsu Matsukata also ended in divorce. His third marriage was to Helen Davis, and they remained married until his death. He turned 100 in November 2014.

Blake died on February 11, 2021, of a gastric blockage at a hospital in Stuart, Florida. He was 106 and he suffered from respiratory failure prior to his death.
