= Hans Jørgen Walle-Hansen =

Norwegian businessman (1912–2012)

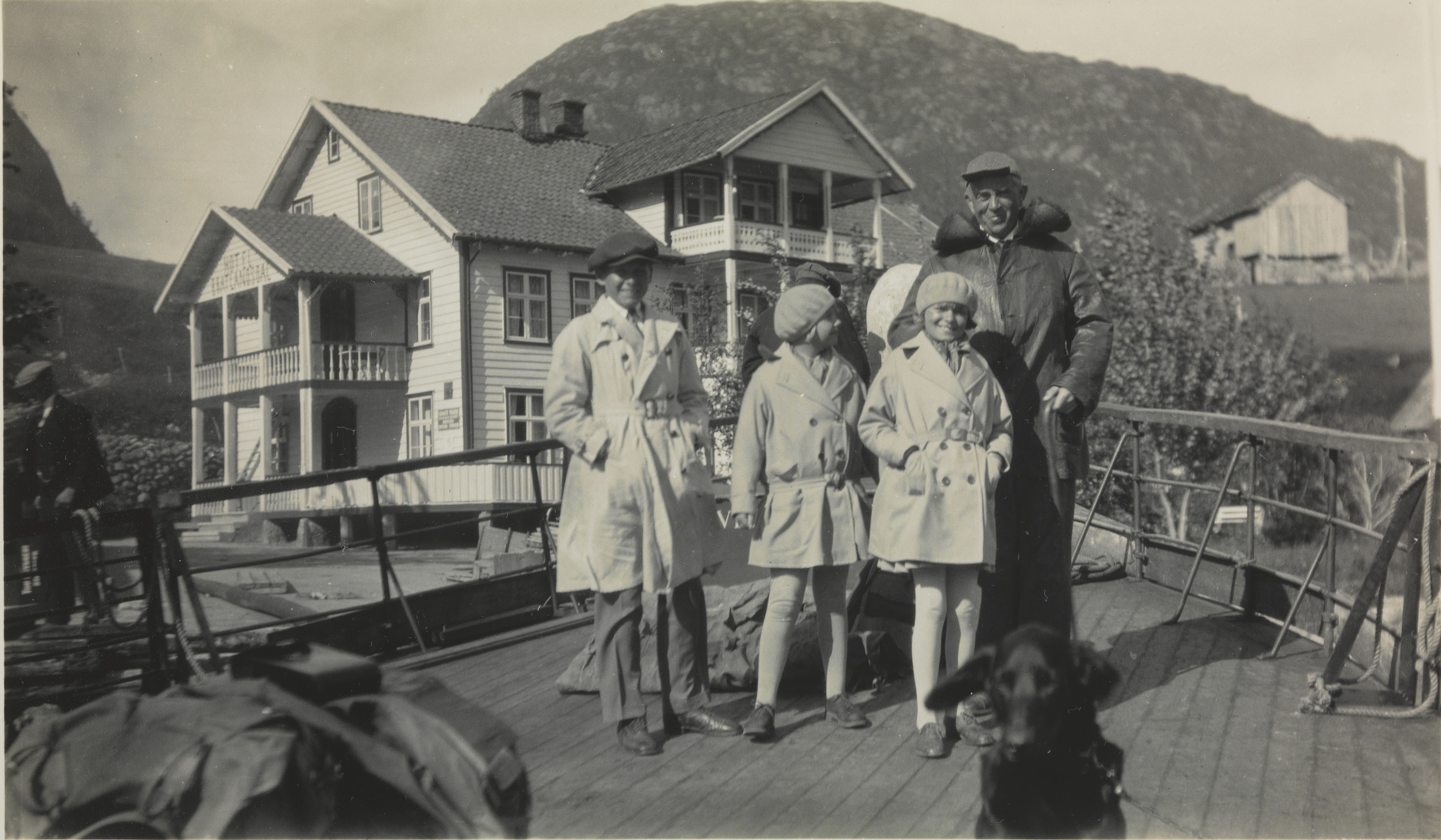
Hans Jørgen Walle-Hansen with family in 1928, Hans Jørgen on the far left.

Hans Jørgen Kåre Strugstad Walle-Hansen (6 April 1912 – 26 November 2012) was a Norwegian businessperson.

He finished his secondary education in 1930 and graduated from Kristiania Commerce School in 1931. After studies in Heidelberg and Munich he took the cand.oecon. degree in 1934. In 1935 he was hired in the family company Brødrene Hansen, where he became partner in 1941.

He was board member of the employers' association Manufakturgrossistenes Landsforening, chair of Oslo Chamber of Commerce and a supervisory council member of Forsikringsselskapet Norden (deputy) and Forsikringsselskapet Viking.

In 2012 he celebrated his 100th birthday.
