= Morris Schwartz =

American journalist

Morris Schwartz (April 3, 1901 – October 22, 2004) was an American photographic inventor, photographer and businessman.

Born in Russia, Schwartz went to the United States in 1906 with his family, including his father Kalman and brother Hy. He started in the New York Times in 1922, staying with the paper until 1926, when he moved to the Jewish Daily Forward, where he was a staff photographer until 1931. In 1930, Schwartz invented a flash synchronizer for work with flashbulbs, then novel replacements for flash powder.

Schwartz invented the "Kalart Flash Synchronizer" in 1930, founding the Kalart company to market this and other products. His father Kalman ran the Kalart Photography Studio in Manhattan; his brother Hy was also a freelance press photographer, and worked with him in making the Kalart products.

== Awards ==
In 1952, Schwartz was awarded the Joseph A. Sprague Memorial Award by the National Press Photographers Association, for "unusual service or achievement beneficial to photojournalism or for an outstanding technology advance in equipment or processes of photojournalism". His citation named "synchronizers, flash equipment, electrical circuits, lens coupled range fliers [sic] and unique camera designs."
