= Brødrene Hansen =

Norwegian real estate company

Brødrene Hansen ("Hansen Brothers") is a Norwegian real estate company and former retailer in Oslo.

It was established by the brothers August, Jørgen, and Hans O. Hansen on 17 October 1864. It was located at the address Kongens gade 29, then Nedre slotsgade 15 from 1899. August Hansen was both the first to retire from the company, and the first founder to die (in 1913). The company was passed down to Jørgen's sons August and Thomas Walle-Hansen. The third generation, with Tom and Hans Jørgen Walle-Hansen, later entered the company.

The company contained retailing and wholesaling of dry goods as well as a readymade clothing factory. In 1969 the retail outlet in Nedre slottsgate 15 was sold to Adelsten Jensen. Brødrene Hansen is now a real estate company. It still owns Nedre slottsgate 15, and in the last half of the 1990s they expanded and bought Konowsgate 80 in Oslo, Astridsgate 26, Astridsgate 34 and Oskarsgate 2 in Sarpsborg and Madam Arnesens vei 43 and Kongens gate 24 in Moss.
