= Friendly's =

U.S. East Coast restaurant chain

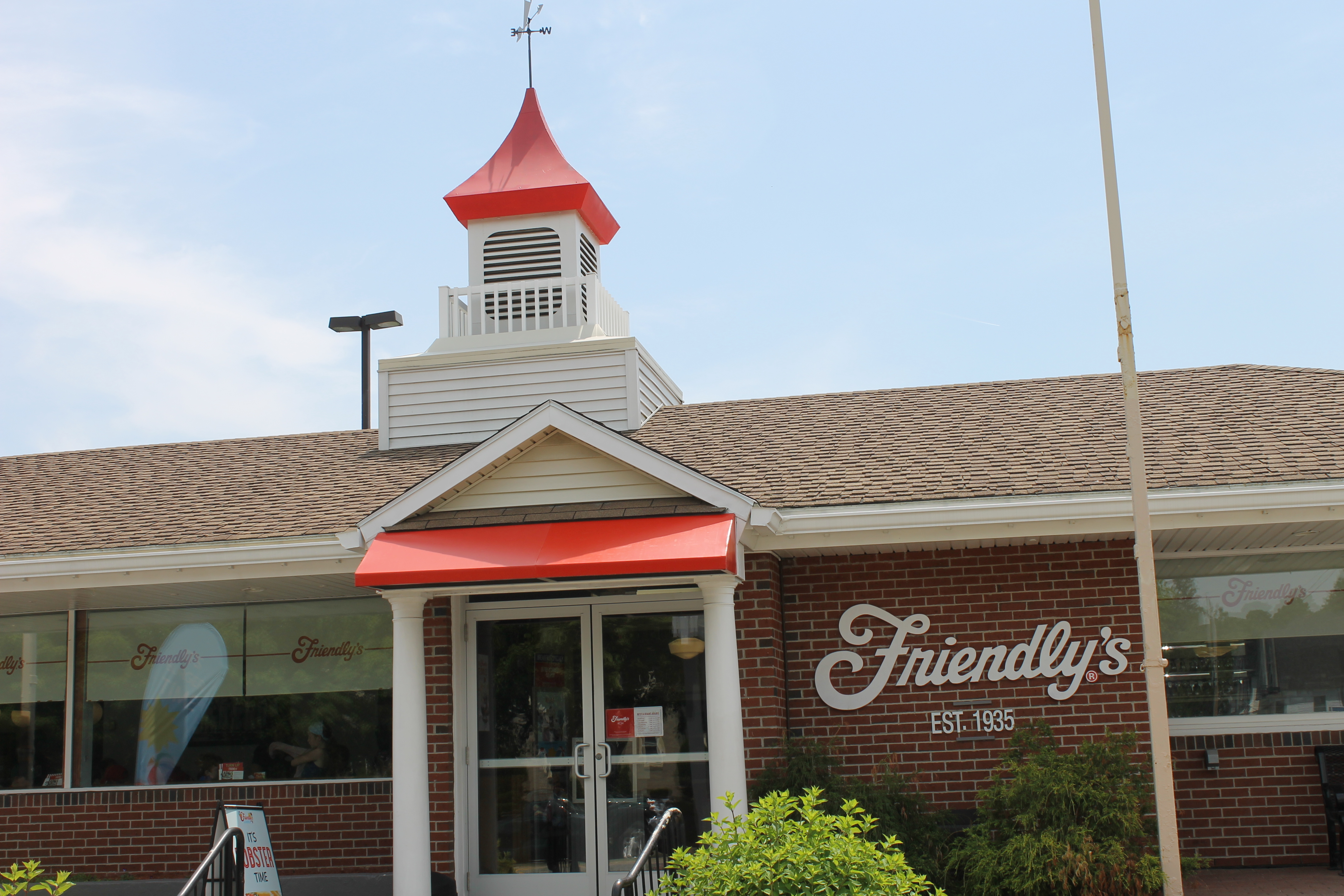
- Friendly's in Augusta, Maine, in June 2014 (closed in April 2019)
- Type: Subsidiary
- Industry: Restaurants Franchising
- Founded: 1935; 91 years ago Springfield, Massachusetts
- Founders: S. Prestley Blake; Curtis Blake
- Headquarters: Wilbraham, Massachusetts, U.S.
- Number of locations: 105
- Key people: George Michel (CEO)
- Products: Sandwiches, burgers, salads, soups, breakfast foods, ice cream, hot dogs
- Number of employees: 10,000
- Parent: Dairy Farmers of America (dairy products); Amici Partners Group (restaurants)
- Website: friendlys.com (dairy products) friendlysrestaurants.com (restaurants)

Friendly's is a restaurant chain on the East Coast of the United States. The first location, selling ice cream cones, opened in 1935 in Springfield, Massachusetts. It was founded by brothers S. Prestley Blake and Curtis Blake. It has 10,000 employees. George Michel is the CEO. It offers diner-style cuisine and highlights its 22 ice cream flavors. Many locations offer an ice-cream only take-out window alongside of the table service option. Friendly's restaurants are found in Massachusetts, Connecticut, Florida, Delaware, Maryland, New Jersey, New York, New Hampshire, Pennsylvania, South Carolina, and Maine. Its ice cream is also sold in some East Coast supermarkets.

== History ==
Friendly's was founded in 1935, at the height of the Great Depression, by brothers Prestley and Curtis Blake in Springfield, Massachusetts. The Blake brothers opened a small ice cream shop named "Friendly", selling double-dip cones for a nickel each. In 1940, a second Friendly in West Springfield was opened with an expanded food menu. During World War II, the Blakes closed the business until the war's end.

By 1951, 10 Friendlys were operating in Connecticut and western Massachusetts. The expansion of the company led to the move of headquarters from Springfield to Wilbraham in 1960.

In 1965, Friendlys super-thick shake, the Awful-Awful, renamed to Fribble.

By 1974 the chain had grown to 500 restaurants in the Mid-Atlantic, Northeast, and Midwest. That year, a food processing and distribution plant opened in Troy, Ohio.

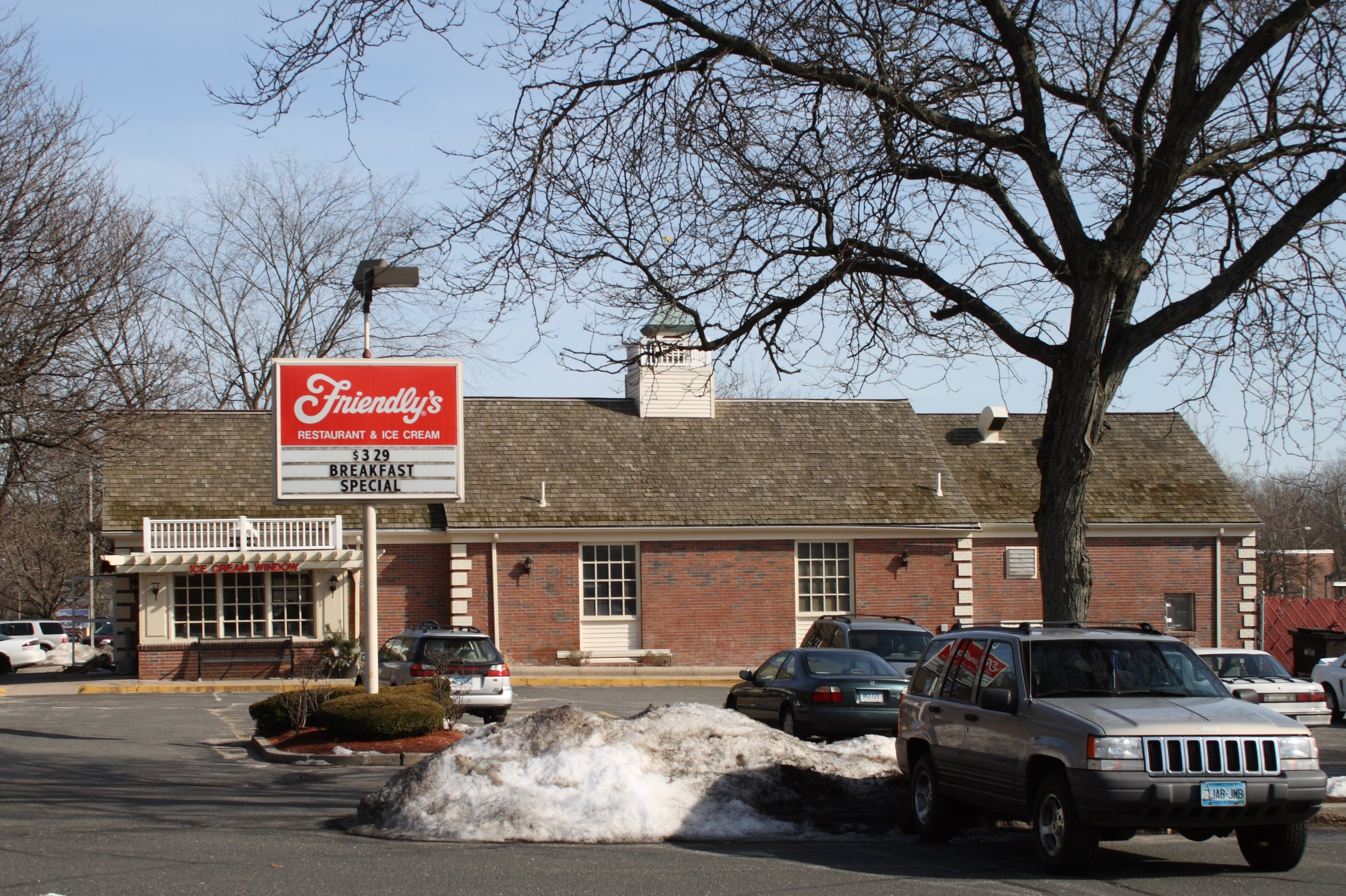
Friendly's in Unionville, Connecticut, in March 2008 (closed in December 2014)

In 1979, the Blake brothers retired and sold Friendly to Hershey Foods Corporation, which operated the chain as a wholly owned subsidiary. In 1988, Donald N. Smith purchased Friendly from the Hershey corporation, with Friendly becoming part of Tennessee Foods. Smith added the 's to Friendly, making its colloquial name official.

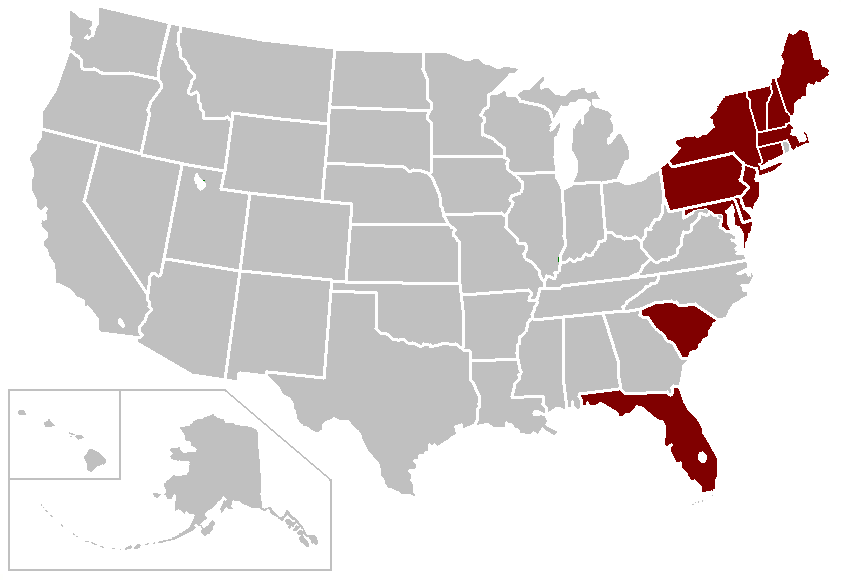
States with Friendly's locations, as of 2018

In 1997, Friendly Ice Cream Corporation debuted on the NASDAQ stock exchange under the symbol FRND. The stock began at $18 per share, peaking at $26. Around then, 34 stores were sold to DavCo Restaurants, which planned 100 openings in the next 10 years. Despite DavCo's efforts, Friendly's stock price fell to $5.

Also in 1997, Friendly's exited the Pittsburgh market after an unsuccessful few-year stint, closing all six restaurants, which were sold and converted to Bob Evans by the spring of 1998.

In 1998, Kim Andereck was brought in as vice president of franchise development and became instrumental in creating an aggressive franchise program for the chain, which had been company-owned. By 2021, about 66% of its restaurants are franchise-owned. In summer 2000, Friendly's switched to the American Stock Exchange; symbol FRN. In June 2007, Friendly's appointed president and CEO George Condos; that summer it was bought for $337 million by the private investment firm Sun Capital Partners, Inc. In December 2008, Ned R. Lidvall was appointed president and CEO.

On August 5, 2009, the first Friendly's Express opened in Mansfield, Massachusetts, with three in 2010: April 28 at Coolidge Corner in Brookline, July 7 in Wareham, and September 28 in Methuen.

On February 10, 2012, Harsha V. Agadi stepped down as chief executive officer. Agadi invested his own money in the company and remains on the board of directors.

On April 12, 2012, Friendly's announced that John M. Maguire had been named chief executive officer of the company.

On November 25, 2014, it was announced that all 14 of the Friendly's locations in Ohio would be closed. Friendly's closed its Brattleboro, Vermont location in 2014.

On June 20, 2016, Dean Foods announced the acquisition of Friendly's Ice Cream for $155 million. This did not change the ownership of the restaurants, as Sun Capital Partners continues to run the existing locations.

In early 2018, Friendly's opened a new "prototype" restaurant at the Apex Center in Marlborough, Massachusetts, to test delivery, catering, online ordering and a revised menu.

Friendly's abruptly closed most of their locations in upstate New York on April 7, 2019. Several locations in New England were also among the closures.

Co-founder Curtis Blake died on May 24, 2019, at the age of 102.

On August 19, 2019, Friendly's closed its North Providence location, its last in Rhode Island.

In early October 2019, the last remaining restaurant in Virginia closed.

Co-founder S. Prestley Blake died on February 11, 2021, at the age of 106.

=== Bankruptcy ===
A casualty of a tough economic environment, rising commodity costs, and changing customer tastes, Friendly's announced it had filed for chapter 11 bankruptcy protection and closed 63 stores in October 2011. The company had secured more than $71 million in debtor-in-possession financing to keep it afloat during bankruptcy proceedings. Later that month, the Pension Benefit Guaranty Corporation, a federal agency responsible for protecting workers' pension benefits, accused Sun Capital of illegally moving assets to keep control of the company. A few days later both parties were able to reach a settlement. On November 1, 2011, the US Bankruptcy Court gave Friendly's permission to sell the company at an auction on December 22, 2011.

On December 21, Friendly Ice Cream Corp cancelled the auction after receiving no offers to compete with the $75 million offer made by an affiliate of its owner, Sun Capital Partners Inc. Sun Capital paid about $75 million and retained ownership through its affiliate. On January 9, 2012, Friendly's announced that it would emerge from bankruptcy protection, but close 37 more locations.

On November 12, 2019, the grocery division of Friendly's, amongst all other associates of its parent company, Dean Foods, filed for Chapter 11 bankruptcy protection.

On November 1, 2020, Friendly's announced that it would file for chapter 11 once more and sell "substantially all its assets" to Amici Partners—an affiliate of Brix Holdings—for $2 million, citing the impact of the COVID-19 pandemic in the United States. The company stated that "nearly all" of its locations would remain open, although some closures (including a location near Mystic Aquarium in Mystic, Connecticut) were announced.

=== Acquisition by Amici Partners Group ===
On January 19, 2021, it was announced that Friendly's was acquired by Amici Partners Group, LLC, a group made of experienced restaurant investors and operators with national and international restaurant franchisor background. Amici has acquired 130 corporate-owned and franchised restaurant locations with plans to keep all locations open.

== Legal issues ==
In 2003, Prestley Blake filed a lawsuit against Friendly Ice Cream Corporation and chairman Donald Smith in a derivative action to force the money back to the company which Blake claimed was improperly paid for use of a private jet. Blake accused Smith of using the jet for personal use and using the airplane lease to carry $3 million annually from the company into another restaurant chain he controlled.

== Topiary sign on Massachusetts Turnpike ==
Sign by Mass. Pike in 2026

In 1974, S. Prestley Blake initiated a project to advertise the company along the Massachusetts Turnpike in Wilbraham. The project used Japanese yew plants to shape the text "Friendly Ice Cream" on a bed of small white stones. The sign is very visible to westbound travelers on the highway shortly after crossing the Wilbraham town line. According to Blake's memoir, it was in part a way to circumvent restrictions that existed at that time on billboards being used along interstate highways. Drivers from Peter Pan Bus Lines reported enjoying seeing the sign as they regularly drove by, which helped mitigate community resistance to the project. It has been maintained regularly since that time, including across the various corporate ownership changes. As of 2025, Dairy Farmers of America which owns the ice cream part of the business continues to maintain the sign. A spokesperson for that company made a statement to the Boston Globe saying, "The sign is a staple in the local community and nostalgic to a lot of people, so we think it's important to maintain."
