= News analytics =

In trading strategy, news analysis refers to the measurement of the various qualitative and quantitative attributes of textual (unstructured data) news stories. Some of these attributes are: sentiment, relevance, and novelty. Expressing news stories as numbers and metadata permits the manipulation of everyday information in a mathematical and statistical way. This data is often used in financial markets as part of a trading strategy or by businesses to judge market sentiment and make better business decisions.

News analytics are usually derived through automated text analysis and applied to digital texts using elements from natural language processing and machine learning such as latent semantic analysis, support vector machines, "bag of words" among other techniques.

== Applications and strategies ==
The application of linguistic analysis to news and social media has grown from an area of research to mature product solutions since 2007. News analytics and news sentiment calculations are now routinely used by both buy side and sell-side in alpha generation, trading execution, risk management, and market surveillance and compliance. There is, however, a good deal of variation in the quality, effectiveness and completeness of currently available solutions.

A large number of companies use news analysis to help them make better business decisions. Academic researchers have become interested in news analysis especially with regards to predicting stock price movements, volatility and traded volume. Provided a set of values such as sentiment and relevance as well as the frequency of news arrivals, it is possible to construct news sentiment scores for multiple asset classes such as equities, Forex, fixed income, and commodities. Sentiment scores can be constructed at various horizons to meet the different needs and objectives of high and low frequency trading strategies, whilst characteristics such as direction and volatility of asset returns as well as the traded volume may be addressed more directly via the construction of tailor-made sentiment scores. Scores are generally constructed as a range of values. For instance, values may range between 0 and 100, where values above and below 50 convey positive and negative sentiment, respectively.

=== Absolute return strategies ===
The objective of absolute return strategies is absolute (positive) returns regardless of the direction of the financial market. To meet this objective, such strategies typically involve opportunistic long and short positions in selected instruments with zero or limited market exposure. In statistical terms, absolute return strategies should have very low correlation with the market return. Typically, hedge funds tend to employ absolute return strategies. Below, a few examples show how news analysis can be applied in the absolute return strategy space with the purpose to identify alpha opportunities applying a market neutral strategy or based on volatility trading.

Example 1

Scenario: The gap between the news sentiment scores for direction, $S$, of Company $X$ and Market $Y$ has moved beyond $+20$. That is, $S_X-S_Y$ ≥ $20$.

Action: Buy the stock on Company $X$ and short the future on Market $Y$.

Exit Strategy: When the gap in the news sentiment scores for direction of Company $X$ and Market $Y$ has disappeared, $S_X-S_Y$ = $0$, sell the stock on Company $X$ and go long the future on Market $Y$ to close the positions.

Example 2

Scenario: The news sentiment score for volatility of Company $X$ goes above $70$ out of $100$ indicating an expected volatility above the option implied volatility.

Action: Buy a short-dated straddle (the purchase of both a put and a call) on the stock of Company $X$.

Exit Strategy: Keep the straddle on Company $X$ until expiry or until a certain profit target has been reached.

=== Relative return strategies ===
The objective of relative return strategies is to either replicate (passive management) or outperform (active management) a theoretical passive reference portfolio or benchmark. To meet these objectives such strategies typically involve long positions in selected instruments. In statistical terms, relative return strategies often have high correlation with the market return. Typically, mutual funds tend to employ relative return strategies. Below, a few examples show how news analysis can be applied in the relative return strategy space with the purpose to outperform the market applying a stock picking strategy and by making tactical tilts to ones asset allocation model.

Example 1

Scenario: The news sentiment score for direction of Company $X$ goes above $70$ out of $100$.

Action: Buy the stock on Company $X$.

Exit Strategy: When the news sentiment score for direction of Company $X$ falls below $60$, sell the stock on Company $X$ to close the position.

Example 2

Scenario: The news sentiment score for direction of Sector $Z$ goes above $70$ out of $100$.

Action: Include Sector $Z$ as a tactical bet in the asset allocation model.

Exit Strategy: When the news sentiment score for direction of Sector $Z$ falls below $60$, remove the tactical bet for Sector $Z$ from the asset allocation model.

=== Financial risk management ===
The objective of financial risk management is to create economic value in a firm or to maintain a certain risk profile of an investment portfolio by using financial instruments to manage risk exposures, particularly credit risk and market risk. Other types include Foreign exchange, Shape, Volatility, Sector, Liquidity, Inflation risks, etc. Below, a few examples show how news analysis can be applied in the financial risk management space with the purpose to either arrive at better risk estimates in terms of Value at Risk (VaR) or to manage the risk of a portfolio to meet ones portfolio mandate.

Example 1

Scenario: The bank operates a VaR model to manage the overall market risk of its portfolio.

Action: Estimate the portfolio covariance matrix taking into account the development of the news sentiment score for volume. Implement the relevant hedges to bring the VaR of the bank in line with the desired levels.

Example 2

Scenario: A portfolio manager operates his portfolio towards a certain desired risk profile.

Action: Estimate the portfolio covariance matrix taking into account the development of the news sentiment score for volume. Scale the portfolio exposure according to the targeted risk profile.

=== Computer algorithms using news analytics ===
Within 0.33 seconds, computer algorithms using news analytics can notify subscribers

- which company the news is about,
- if the news article sentiment is positive or negative,
- if the news is ranked as high or low relative importance … relative relevance.
- the stock price reaction and the increase in trade volume is concentrated in the first 5 seconds after an news article is released.

=== Algorithmic order execution ===
The objective of algorithmic order execution, which is part of the concept of algorithmic trading, is to reduce trading costs by optimizing on the timing of a given order. It is widely used by hedge funds, pension funds, mutual funds, and other institutional traders to divide up large trades into several smaller trades to manage market impact, opportunity cost, and risk more effectively. The example below shows how news analysis can be applied in the algorithmic order execution space with the purpose to arrive at more efficient algorithmic trading systems.

Example 1

Scenario: A large order needs to be placed in the market for the stock on Company $X$.

Action: Scale the daily volume distribution for Company $X$ applied in the algorithmic trading system, thus taking into account the news sentiment score for volume. This is followed by the creation of the desired trading distribution forcing greater market participation during the periods of the day when volume is expected to be heaviest.

== Effects ==
Being able to express news stories as numbers permits the manipulation of everyday information in a statistical way that allows computers not only to make decisions once made only by humans, but to do so more efficiently. Since market participants are always looking for an edge, the speed of computer connections and the delivery of news analysis, measured in milliseconds, have become essential.

== See also ==
- Computational linguistics
- Sentiment analysis
- Text mining
- Trading the news
- Unstructured data
- Natural language processing
- Information asymmetry
- Algorithmic trading
