= Grauer =

Grauer is a Germanic surname meaning "grey", which may refer to:

- Ben Grauer (1908–1977), American radio and TV personality
- Connie Grauer (born ?), American musician, Mrs. Fun
- Frederick L. A. Grauer (born ?), American banker
- Joshua Kuroda-Grauer (born 2003), American baseball player
- Ona Grauer (born 1978), Mexican-born Canadian actress
- Peter Grauer (born 1946), American businessman
- Rudolf Grauer (1870–1927), Austrian explorer and zoologist
- Stuart Grauer (born 1950), American educator, author, and founder of the Grauer School
- Thaddeus Grauer, Austrian art dealer
- Uwe Grauer (born 1970), German footballer and coach
- William E. Grauer (born ?), American lawyer
