= Relative return =

Measure of the return on an investment

Relative return is a measure of the return or profit of an investment portfolio relative to a theoretical passive reference portfolio or benchmark.

In active portfolio management, the aim is to maximize the relative return (often subject to a risk constraint). In passive portfolio management, the aim is to obtain a relative return as close to zero as possible, thereby reproducing the return of the theoretical reference portfolio. When the relative return is positive, the portfolio is said to outperform the benchmark. Conversely, when the relative return is negative, the portfolio is said to underperform the benchmark.

Within passive portfolio management, the absolute value of the relative return is often called the tracking error, which is confusing since the tracking error is more generally defined as the standard deviation of the relative return. Index funds are the financial products that use passively managed portfolios.

== Portfolio manager evaluation ==
Many investors use the relative return measure to evaluate the skill of the portfolio manager: if the relative return is positive, then the portfolio manager has skill. However, the relative return measure by itself is not sufficient to quantify how much skill a portfolio manager has, since the measure does not take into account the amount of risk that the portfolio manager has taken. Also, because investment returns are largely due to chance, a portfolio manager's historical performance is not a good indicator of skill. Funds that have historically out-performed the market, cannot be expected to outperform the market in future years.

Juxtaposed with the relative return measure is the absolute return measure, which is used to describe the return of the investment portfolio itself. In recent years, so-called absolute return strategies, that aim to always produce a positive absolute return regardless of the directions of financial market, have become popular. Contrary to popular opinion, it is not true that the relative return cannot be measured in a meaningful sense for absolute return strategies. After all, the neutral position of these portfolios is to be fully invested in cash without any other long or short positions. Thus, the risk-free rate is an appropriate benchmark to use for measuring the relative return of absolute return strategies.

== See also ==
- Index fund
- Enhanced indexing
- Return
