= Active return =

Measure of profitability relative to an investment benchmark

In finance, active return refers to the returns produced by an investment portfolio due to active management decisions made by the portfolio manager that cannot be explained by the portfolio's exposure to returns or to risks in the portfolio's investment benchmark; active return is usually the objective of active management and subject of performance attribution. In contrast, passive returns refers to returns produced by an investment portfolio due to its exposure to returns of its benchmark. Passive returns can be obtained deliberately through passive tracking of the portfolio benchmark or obtained inadvertently through an investment process unrelated to tracking the index.

Benchmark portfolios are often represented in theoretical contexts to include all investment assets - sometimes called a market portfolio in these contexts, but is in practice a subset of practically available investable assets. In those cases where the benchmark or the market portfolio include all investable assets, active management is a zero-sum game, as no group of active managers can achieve positive active returns over the benchmark portfolio without another group of managers taking the other side of those positions and producing negative active returns; active managers as a whole in this case cannot outperform the market portfolio.

In a simple arithmetic return attribution, if $R_p$ denotes the return for the portfolio and $R_b$ denotes the return for the benchmark, then a simple active return is given by $R_p - R_b$, and can be either positive or negative.

== Active return in the context of Brinson models ==
Brinson and Fachler (1985) and Brinson, Hood, and Beebower (1986) introduced the Brinson models as a foundation for investment portfolio performance attribution. These models further sub-divide active returns due to active management into security selection - return achieved through selecting different securities than the benchmark, asset allocation - return achieved through weighting asset classes in a portfolio differently than the benchmark, and other types of return categories. These divisions are useful to account for and to measure portfolio manager skill. The volatility of active return and volatility of sub-divisions of active return can be measured as active risk.

== Active return in the context of CAPM ==
Active return is often studied in the context of CAPM, the Capital Asset Pricing Model, as that model provides ways to measure and to justify active return. In the context of CAPM, a portfolio's investment benchmark represents a consensus market portfolio. All portfolio and asset returns over a risk-free cash interest rate ("excess returns") can be decomposed into two uncorrelated components: (i) a fraction (beta) of the excess return of the market portfolio (M) and (ii) a residual return (theta). CAPM implies that, under certain assumptions, the expected residual return is zero, and that all expected portfolio and asset returns equal to their fraction (or beta) of the return of the market portfolio.

These predictions imply that one may measure active returns relatively easily: a linear regression of the excess returns of a portfolio against a consensus market excess return. Such a linear regression produces an estimated alpha (or intercept), and an estimated beta on market excess returns. Assuming all CAPM assumptions hold in the particular context, the estimated beta of the market portfolio excess return is the CAPM beta, the residual (assumed to be zero in a linear regression) represents the residual return in CAPM, and alpha represents active returns achieved through active management of the portfolio. CAPM implies that changing the beta of a portfolio to time for periods of high market portfolio returns, a type of market timing, cannot achieve active returns, since in the CAPM context active return is defined as return in excess of market portfolio returns. The assumptions of CAPM also point to ways for active management to achieving active return, which involves investing on information not yet incorporated into the consensus around the market portfolio.

== Uses of Active Return ==
Measurements of active return play a big role in investment manager evaluation, compensation, and selection. Active return forecasts are an input into portfolio return forecasts, which are crucial inputs in investment planning and asset-liability management. Portfolio managers could examine active returns to evaluate which active decisions or types of active decisions have succeeded in their portfolios, to allocate resources (personnel, dollar budgets, risk budgets, etc.) to implement different active decisions, and to communicate with fund sponsors about portfolio performance.

=== Uses from the perspective of fund sponsors ===
Fund sponsors typically look for proficiency, consistency, and precision in the ability of active portfolio investment managers to produce active returns. A portfolio's scale of active returns implies a manager is proficient in producing active returns, its repeatability of active returns over time implies a manager is consistent at producing active returns, and its conformity of its sources of active returns with the manager's stated investment objectives implies a manager is precise in producing active returns. Fund sponsors typically choose a number of investment managers and allocate them assets to manage; they could compare these qualities of active returns among different investment managers to adjust allocations to their mandates.

=== Uses form the perspective of investment managers ===
In cases where investment managers pursue multiple investment strategies in a single portfolio, such as fund of funds or multi-strategy portfolios, investment managers could use qualities of active returns of particular strategies to shift resources between investment strategies in the portfolio much like how fund sponsors would shift allocations between investment managers. The active return and active risk of individual investment strategies can be used to calculate information ratio, which can be used to allocation investment strategies, and/or individual investments in assets, such as stocks, in a portfolio to maximize total portfolio active return.

== See also ==
- Information ratio
- Tracking error
