= Absolute return (disambiguation) =

Absolute return is a financial term used for measuring the gain or loss on an investment portfolio.

Absolute return may also refer to:

- Absolute Return + Alpha, a magazine about hedge funds
- Absolute Return for Kids, a charitable organization based in the United Kingdom
- Absolute Return Capital, an affiliate of the investment firm Bain Trust
- Absolute Return Trust, a British investment trust
