= Bruno Crastes =

French businessman

Bruno Crastes (born 15 May 1965) is a French fund manager specialising in absolute return/global bond strategies and CEO of H2O Asset Management.

== Early life and education ==
Bruno Crastes was born on 15 May 1965, in the suburbs of Lyon. He received a BA in mathematics from the University of Lyon and graduated in actuarial sciences from the Institut de Science Financière et d’Assurances.

== Career ==
After graduation, he started his career at Bank Louis Dreyfus as a proprietary trader on bond market. He then moved to Indosuez Asset Management (later known as Crédit Agricole Asset Management and then Amundi), a French asset management company. He began managing global fixed income portfolios at Crédit Agricole Asset Management and rose through the ranks and from 1994 on, he headed the global fixed income desk. He was appointed CIO of CAAM London in 2002 and then CEO in 2005. The same year, he was the top manager in the Citywire Fund Manager ratings for France. He topped the league again in 2006. In 2007, he was nominated for the "CIO of the Year" award. In 2010, following the creation of Amundi, he was appointed member of the executive committee and Deputy Head of the Institutional Investment Division. "Top fund manager and fixed income specialist for over 20 years", Bruno Crastes has been made famous developing an innovative range of absolute return range of open-ended funds called VaR funds from March 1999. One of the VaR funds, CAAM Invest VaR 20 I EUR fund, won the Lipper award for Global macro in Europe in 2010.

In 2010, he co-founded H2O AM LLP with Vincent Chailley, focusing on liquid absolute return strategies. He was nominated "Best global bond manager of the past five years" in June 2013 with a performance of 89.71% vs. 33.65% for the peer group. In December 2014, he arrived second in the Top 100 European fund managers ranking of l'Agefi Suisse. He is currently acting as Group Corporate & Market Strategy Director of H2O AM and Vincent Chailley as Group CIO. He received the "Prix spécial BFMTV" on behalf of H2O AM in February 2015. His fund H2O MultiBonds FCP won the absolute return bond fund award at the Investment Week Specialist awards ceremony in Autumn 2015.

Natixis holds 23.4% of H2O AM shares via Natixis Investment Managers.

On 30 December 2022, he was sentenced in France by the Autorité des marchés financiers (France) (the French FCA) to a fine of 15 million euros for three technical grievances on non-compliance with investment rules, H2O was fined 75 million euros on this occasion.
