= Amundi =

French asset management firm

Amundi S.A.

- Headquarters in Paris.
- Type: Public
- Traded as: Euronext Paris: AMUN; CAC Next 20 component
- Industry: Investment management
- Founded: 2010; 16 years ago
- Headquarters: Paris, France
- Area served: Worldwide
- Key people: Olivier Gavalda (chairman); Valérie Baudson (CEO)
- Products: Mutual funds; Exchange-traded funds; Index funds; Asset management; Risk management
- AUM: ▲€2.58 trillion (Q2 2026)
- Owner: Crédit Agricole (68.35%)
- Number of employees: 5,600 (2025)
- Subsidiaries: BFT Investment Managers; CPR Asset Management; Lyxor Asset Management
- Website: amundi.com

Amundi S.A. is a French asset management company. With €2.38 trillion (~2.72 trillion USD) of assets under management (AUM) in 2025, it is one of the ten biggest investment managers in the world.

Founded on 1 January 2010, the company is the result of the merger between the asset management activities of Crédit Agricole (Crédit Agricole Asset Management, CAAM) and Société Générale (Société Générale Asset Management, SGAM). Amundi Group has been listed on the Euronext stock exchange since November 2015. Its majority shareholder is Crédit Agricole S.A.

In legal terms, Amundi Group owns Amundi Asset Management, as well as several other subsidiaries in the asset management sector, notably CPR Asset Management (CPR AM) and BFT Investment Managers (BFT IM) in France.

Amundi is involved in a range of investment management activities. The company is particularly engaged in active management, through a range of mutual funds (equity management, bond management, diversified management, structured products management and treasury management) as well as in passive management as an ETF issuer and index fund manager. The company also offers products in the real and alternative asset investment segments (real estate and private equity in particular). Its offering is aimed at retail investors and institutional investors, either in the form of collectivised investments or specific mandates. In France, Amundi is more widely known for its activities in the field of French employee savings schemes (épargne salariale). The company also has a research and analysis unit, which issues regular publications on global economic conditions and stock market developments.

Amundi Group has offices in several countries around the world, including Europe, Asia and the United States, and is estimated to have around 100 million direct or indirect individual clients and 1,000 institutional customers worldwide.

== History ==
=== Origins ===
At the end of 2008, Crédit Agricole and Société Générale decided to merge their respective asset management subsidiaries into a new company. Previously, these two subsidiaries, Crédit Agricole Asset Management (CAAM) and Société Générale Asset Management (SGAM), had each managed a range of UCITS funds, consisting of bond funds, equity funds, alternative and structured products, as well as an array of ETFs.

A preliminary agreement was signed on 26 January 2009 between the two stakeholders, then a final agreement was signed on 9 July 2009, stipulating that Crédit Agricole would own 75% of the new company and Société Générale 25%, with it being managed by Yves Perrier, then CEO of CAAM. The name 'Amundi' was officially announced on 23 October 2009 The company was created on 1 January 2010 following permission from the European Commission to proceed with the merger. The merger of the two teams took place progressively over the course of 2010 and led to 260 jobs being cut globally, and the creation of about 60 new positions in risk management and commercial distribution.

With €670 billion of assets under management on the eve of its creation, Amundi emerged as the third largest European asset management company, behind Axa and Allianz, and became one of the top 10 biggest asset managers worldwide.

=== Development in Europe and the United States ===
Amundi's funds are primarily distributed through the banking networks of its majority shareholders: Crédit Agricole, LCL (a subsidiary of Crédit Agricole), Société Générale and Crédit du Nord (a subsidiary of Société Générale), which collectively comprised more than 70% of Amundi's net inflows at inception, with the remainder being drawn from institutional investors. The company has been expanding its investor base over time. In 2015, more than 60% of its assets under management came from sources outside of these banking networks.

In 2012, Amundi drew up a distribution agreement with asset manager TOBAM and took a 10.6% stake in the company's capital (a stake that increased to 20% in 2016).

In June 2013, Amundi announced the acquisition of Smith Breeden Associates in the United States, which became effective in October 2013. The company, which specialises in managing bond funds in dollars, then managed approximately $6.4 billion, or €4.9 billion. As a result of the transaction, Smith Breeden Associates was renamed ‘Amundi Smith Breeden LLC’ and became the head office for Amundi's North American operations.

In October 2014, Amundi acquired 100% of the capital of Bawag PSK Invest, an investment management subsidiary of the Austrian bank Bawag PSK, marking the arrival of Amundi in the Austrian market. Bawag PSK Invest, which became part of the Amundi franchise, manages around €4.6 billion of assets through a range of 78 funds. The acquisition included an agreement with Bawag Bank PSK to distribute Amundi's funds through its network of around 500 branches in Austria. Shortly thereafter, Amundi announced the acquisition of 87.5% of the capital of Kleinwort Benson Investors, a Dublin-based investment management company with branches in Boston and New York with €7.6 billion of assets.

During 2014, Crédit Agricole S.A. increased its stake in Amundi by acquiring 5% of the company's capital from Société Générale for €337.5 million. Crédit Agricole S.A. thereby gained control of 80% of Amundi's capital.

=== Initial public offering ===
On 17 June 2015, Crédit Agricole and Société Générale announced their intention to list Amundi on the stock market before the end of the year. The IPO enabled Société Générale to sell its 20% stake in the company and Crédit Agricole to sell 5%, remaining the majority shareholder with 75% of Amundi's overall share capital. Amundi Group was listed on the Euronext stock exchange on 12 November 2015 with a market capitalisation of 7.5 billion euros. The group's shares were priced at 45 euros per share and ended their first session at just above 47 euros. The press contrasted the success of the IPO with those of Deezer and Oberthur Technologies, both of which had to be cancelled prior to Amundi's flotation in the context of a difficult trading environment due to market turbulence in summer 2015.

In December 2016, Amundi announced the 100% acquisition of Pioneer Investments, the asset management subsidiary of Italian bank UniCredit. Pioneer Investments was bought out for 3.5 billion euros. The transaction was financed by Amundi for 1.5 billion euros, via a €600 million debt issuance and a €1.4 billion capital increase guaranteed by Crédit Agricole. As a result of the transaction, Crédit Agricole held no more than 70% of Amundi's capital at the end of 2017, compared with 75% previously.

Following its completion on 3 July 2017, the transaction meant Amundi added €242.9 billion to its assets under management during the third quarter of 2017, increasing its overall AUM from €1,121 billion at the end of June 2017 to €1,400 billion at the end of September. Amundi consequently became the eighth largest asset management company in the world. At the end of 2017, Amundi managed €1,426 billion of assets.

The acquisition enabled Amundi to expand its distribution network in Italy, Germany and Austria, where Pioneer Investments already had an established presence, while broadening its investment management expertise. Italy became Amundi's second largest market after France. In the United States, the name ‘Pioneer’ was retained and merged with Amundi's to create a new brand, ‘Amundi Pioneer’.

When the acquisition was announced, Amundi said it intended to reduce the combined workforce of the two companies by 450 people out of a total of 5,000 employees worldwide.

=== New acquisitions and partnerships ===
In 2020, Amundi acquired 100% of the Spanish company Sabadell AM (€22 billion of assets under management), a subsidiary of Banco Sabadell. The transaction was carried out for an amount of 430 million euros and included a 10-year agreement with Banco Sabadell to distribute Amundi's funds in Spain. The same year, Amundi has started a partnership in China with BOC Wealth Management, a subsidiary of Bank of China, to create "Amundi BOC Wealth Management Company Limited", a joint venture owned by Amundi (55%) and BOC Wealth Management (45%).

In 2021, Amundi announced the acquisition of Lyxor Asset Management from Société Générale for €825 million. The transaction enabled Amundi to integrate €148 billion of assets managed by Lyxor as of 31 December 2021. Lyxor's expertise in ETF management has enabled Amundi to develop its passive management business and to become the second largest ETF provider in Europe behind BlackRock. With the integration of Lyxor, Amundi has passed the threshold of €2 trillion under management by the end of 2021.

In April 2024, Amundi agreed to sell its $104 billion U.S. business to Victory Capital for a 26.1% stake in Victory and access to its U.S. products and clientele. In November 2025, Amundi bought a 9.9% stake in British private equity investment firm ICG plc.

== Activities ==
=== Asset management ===
Amundi's business involves managing investment funds in which individual investors, institutional investors or companies can invest, on either a collective or individual basis (via mandates and dedicated funds), using their savings, capital and/or treasury, by delegating the management of that money to Amundi. Amundi's core business is "asset management on behalf of third parties" and the group's turnover (net banking income) is made up of fees charged on the assets Amundi manages (mainly subscription fees and annual management fees). Amundi manages different types of funds, including a range of UCITS funds and exchange-traded funds (ETFs), as well as funds invested in real and alternative assets, notably in real estate and structured products.

==== UCITS ====
Amundi manages a broad range of UCITS funds, which are divided into two main categories: equities (stock funds) and bonds (bond funds and money market funds). In addition to these two product lines, there are two transversal divisions using a "diversified management" approach. These combine different asset classes (equities, bonds, monetary assets, real estate) within the same fund and use an "absolute return" approach to investing. Absolute return investing aims to generate annual returns that are greater than or equal to the performance generated by money market investments. Investing in UCITS had been the main expertise of CAAM and SGAM, and these firms were able to attract flows into the funds via the banking networks of Crédit Agricole and Société Générale. Since Amundi's creation, the group's portfolio of mutual funds has been promoted by Crédit Agricole and Société Générale's network of banking advisers, as well as increasingly by private or professional investors, both in France and overseas.

==== ETFs ====
Amundi is also involved in passive management through the sale of ETFs. These funds are marketed under the brand name ‘Amundi ETF’. At the end of 2017, the group managed 38 billion euros of this type of product. Historically speaking, Amundi's ETF business was inherited from CASAM (Credit Agricole Structured Asset Management), a branch of CAAM which managed 65 ETFs at the end of 2009 before Amundi was created. In 2009, SGAM's ETF range was transferred to Lyxor Asset Management, a subsidiary of Société Générale. Amundi ETF offers a range of products divided into two categories: equity ETFs (replicating the performance of national, regional or sectoral market indices) and bond ETFs (replicating the performance of government or corporate bonds).

==== Real and alternative assets ====
By September 2016, Amundi had moved all of its real estate, private debt, private equity and infrastructure investments onto a single platform dedicated to "real and alternative assets". Creating this line of business brought together €34 billion of assets under management, with the objective of reaching €70 billion of AUM by 2020. The division is predominantly made up of real estate investments. Among the buildings acquired by Amundi since the platform's launch are those in the La Défense business district of Paris, including Cœur Défense (acquired in 2017 in partnership with Crédit Agricole Assurances and Primonial REIM) and the Hekla Tower (acquired off-plan in 2017 in partnership with Primonial REIM). Amundi's property holdings are structured as real estate investment vehicles; the most important of these, "OPCIMMO", was launched in 2011. In private equity, Amundi created Amundi Private Equity Funds, a subsidiary aimed at acquiring stakes in unlisted companies. It offers both debt and equity financing for companies. One debt fund launched by the asset manager in 2017 was backed by physical stocks of ham and Parmesan held in Italy, according to the financial press. In the field of infrastructure investment, Amundi developed a partnership with French energy supplier Électricité de France (EDF) by creating ‘Amundi Transition Energétique’, a subsidiary owned 60% by Amundi and 40% by EDF, to finance projects related to renewable energies. In 2017, Amundi also developed a partnership with the French Alternative Energies and Atomic Energy Commission by creating ‘Supernova Invest’, a company 40% owned by Amundi Private Equity to invest in technological innovation projects in France.

==== Socially responsible investment ====
In 2018, Amundi advanced its activities in the practice of socially responsible investing (SRI). In March 2018, Amundi joined forces with the International Finance Corporation (a member of the World Bank Group) to launch a green bond focused on emerging market countries. With $1.42 billion of assets at the time of its launch, the vehicle is the largest green bond fund in the world. In October 2018, Amundi also announced its ‘2021 Action Plan’, which seeks to bring all its investments in line with environmental, social and corporate governance (ESG) criteria. By 2021, 100% of the group's assets under management will be invested in accordance with ESG criteria, compared to just 5% (32 billion euros) at the time of Amundi's launch in 2010, and 19% (280 billion euros) when the plan was announced in 2018. As part of this plan, Amundi also committed itself to take account of ESG criteria in its voting policy when participating in annual general meetings of firms in which it is a shareholder.

As of December 2022, Amundi has US$911.45 billion of assets under management in responsible investment.

=== Research and financial analysis ===
In addition to its management activities, Amundi has a research department dedicated to market analysis and the study of global economic conditions. In 2022, the company announced the merger of its economic research, market strategy and asset allocation advisory divisions into a single department called "Amundi Institute". This department is headed by Pascal Blanqué.

The group publishes free and open access economic research in both French and English on the Amundi Research Center website. Every month, Amundi publishes a monthly paper on the website entitled ‘Cross Asset Investment Strategy’. Amundi also organises an annual conference called the ‘Amundi World Investment Forum’ during which various external speakers discuss macroeconomic topics. In 2018, this forum was notably marked by the presence of Janet Yellen, former Fed chairwoman.

Amundi also uses external financial analyses to support its investment management activities. In the context of the entry into force of European directive MIFID II in January 2018, requiring asset management companies to be more transparent to their customers about this type of cost, Amundi chose to cover the costs of external research itself without passing those on to clients.

=== Services ===
Amundi also launched ‘Amundi Services’ in 2016, renamed ‘Amundi Technology’ in March 2021. This division aims to offer services to other asset management companies as well as institutional investors. The offering is inspired by BlackRock's ‘Aladdin’ platform and provides clients with a Portfolio Management System in SaaS mode called ALTO (Amundi Leading Technologies & Operations). ALTO covers all front- and middle-office functionalities: investment decisions, buy and sell orders, verification of investment rules, calculation of risk indicators, performance monitoring and the generation of factsheets for clients. In 2021, Amundi announced a partnership with BNY Mellon to integrate the ‘OMNI’ tools developed by BNY Mellon into Amundi Technology's offering, for clients mainly based in the US and the UK.

In 2021, Amundi reported that Amundi Technology's tools are used by 24 clients (investment firms), including 11 clients who joined in 2020. Among these clients is Goldman Sachs Fund Solutions, for whom Amundi Technology has been managing, monitoring and supervising quantitative and alternative management products since 2018. Other ALTO users include Asteria Investment Managers since 2020 and BNY Mellon since 2022.

== Subsidiaries and partnerships ==
=== In France ===
Amundi owns several subsidiaries in the asset management sector in France.

CPR Asset Management (CPR AM) is an asset management company wholly owned by Amundi. The company was previously a subsidiary of Crédit Agricole Asset Management (CAAM) from the former Compagnie parisienne de réescompte acquired by Crédit Agricole Indosuez in 2000. CPR AM offers a range of UCITS funds invested in equities and / or fixed income products, addressed at a clientele which is predominantly composed of institutional investors and wealth management professionals. In 2015, Amundi announced that CPR AM would become its centre of expertise for investing in thematic equities and transferred €2.4 billion of its assets under management (AUM) to the subsidiary. At the end of 2021, CPR AM managed €64 billion of AUM.

BFT Investment Managers (BFT IM) is a French asset management company which has been wholly owned by Amundi since 2011, when Crédit Agricole transferred its subsidiary BFT Gestion to the group. In 2015, BFT Gestion changed its name and became BFT Investment Managers. BFT IM offers a range of mutual funds invested in equities or fixed income products aimed at a clientele mainly composed of institutional investors and companies. At the end of 2021, BFT IM managed 39 billion euros of AUM.

Lyxor Asset Management is also a subsidiary of Amundi since 2021. The company is specialized in ETF management, but also in alternative investment, including services for hedge funds. At the end of 2021, Lyxor Asset Management managed €148 billion in assets.

In France, Amundi also owns two subsidiaries which were inherited from SGAM at the time of the merger with CAAM. These are Étoile Gestion (linked to the Crédit du Nord network) and Société Générale Gestion. Amundi also owns a 20% stake in TOBAM as well as a 3.2% stake in Tikehau.

=== Overseas presence ===
Amundi has six asset management platforms around the world, in Paris, London, Tokyo, Boston, Dublin and Milan.

Amundi has offices in most European countries to distribute its investment products locally. The Group has subsidiaries in Luxembourg (Amundi Luxembourg), Switzerland (Amundi Switzerland, with a presence in both Geneva and Zurich), Germany (Amundi Deutschland GmbH, present in Frankfurt and Munich), Austria (Amundi Austria GmbH), Italy (Amundi SGR SpA) and Spain (Amundi Iberia SGIIC). In Luxembourg, Amundi also holds a 50.04% stake in Fund Channel, an investment fund distribution platform held in a joint venture with BNP Paribas, which owns 49.96% of the company.

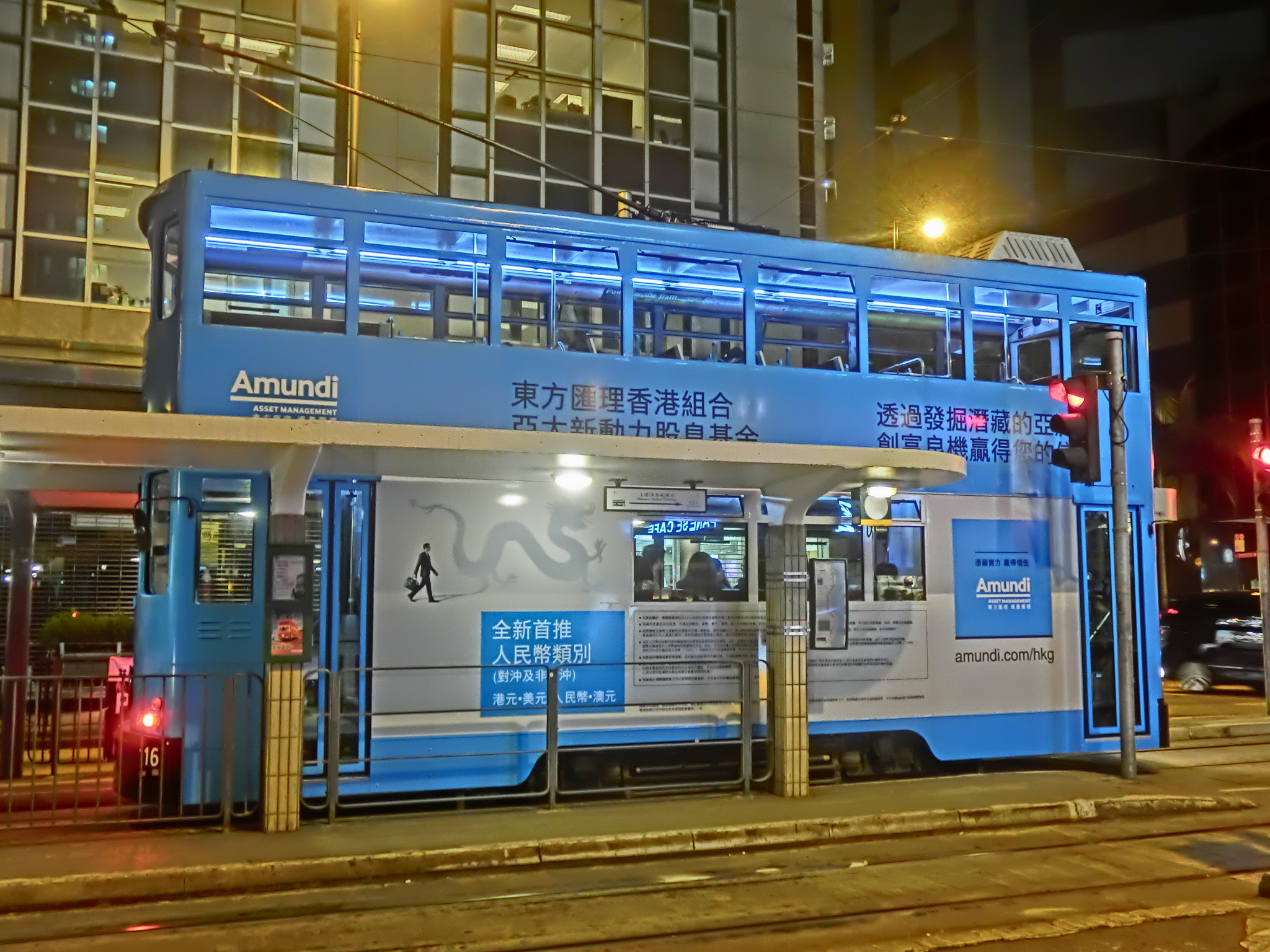
Amundi ads on Hong Kong tramway.

In Asia Pacific, Amundi's main market outside of Europe, the group owns a subsidiary in Japan (Amundi Japan) as a result of the acquisition of Resona Asset Management by SGAM in 2004. Amundi has other subsidiaries in Hong Kong (Amundi Hong Kong Limited), Taiwan (Amundi Taiwan Limited), Singapore (Amundi Singapore Limited), Thailand (Amundi Mutual Fund Brokerage Securities (Thailand) Company Limited), Malaysia (Amundi Malaysia Sdn Bhd) and Australia (Amundi Asset Management Australia Ltd). Amundi also has a presence in four other areas of the Asian continent, via joint ventures with local financial players. In China, Amundi holds 33.3% of ABC-CA Fund Management, an asset management company that emerged from a partnership between the Agricultural Bank of China and Crédit Agricole, as well as 55% of Amundi BOC Wealth Management Company Limited, jointly owned with BOC Wealth Management, a subsidiary of Bank of China. In India, the group owns 37% of SBI Mutual Fund, an asset management company held in partnership with the State Bank of India (SGAM inherited partnership). In South Korea, Amundi owns 40% of NH-Amundi Asset Management, an asset management company 60% owned by NongHyup Financial Group of Korea. In 2020, the combined AUM managed by Amundi in Asia amounted to nearly 300 billion euros.

In the US, Amundi has an office in Durham as a result of its acquisition of Smith Breeden Associates. But the group's main US headquarters are in Boston, where its subsidiary Amundi Pioneer is based. Amundi Pioneer leads Amundi's North American operations. The group also has a presence in Montreal (Amundi Canada Inc.). In Latin America, Amundi has offices in Mexico and Chile, both of which are affiliated with Amundi Iberia SGIIC, as well as in Argentina.

In the Maghreb and the Middle East, Amundi has a branch in Morocco (Amundi Investment Morocco) which is dedicated to real estate investment. The group also owns 34% of Wafa Gestion, based in Morocco. Further, the group has an office in Armenia (Amundi ACBA) and two branches in the United Arab Emirates, in Abu Dhabi and Dubai.

== Sponsorships ==
In February 2021, Amundi announced that it had become the title sponsor of The Evian Championship, a women's golf tournament held in France that is one of the five major championships recognized by the U.S. LPGA, which operates the most lucrative women's professional tour. The sponsorship deal runs for five years.

== Key financials ==
Key financials in million euros (as of 31 December)
Year	2010	2011	2012	2013	2014	2015	2016	2017	2018	2019	2020	2021
Revenue	1,448	1,370	1,456	1,438	1,540	1,656	1,694	2,301	2,582	2,707	2,595	3,204
EBITDA	609	629	700	665	730	773	816	1,128	1,251	1,331	1,255	1,670
Net income	403	422	485	450	488	528	568	681	855	959	910	1,369

== See also ==
- List of asset management firms
