= Charles D. Ellis =

American investment consultant

- Born: Charles D. Ellis; October 22, 1937 (age 88)
- Education: Yale College (BA); Harvard Business School; New York University (PhD)
- Occupation: Investment consultant

Charles “Charley” D. Ellis (born October 22, 1937) is an American investment consultant. In 1972, Ellis founded Greenwich Associates, an international strategy consulting firm focused on financial institutions. Ellis is known as a leader in promoting the use of diversified passive investing through index funds.

== Early life and education ==
Ellis was born in 1937 in Roxbury, Boston, Massachusetts. Ellis’ father, Raymond W., served in the Navy during World War II. Ellis went to the Phillips Exeter Academy and then Yale College where he received his BA in art history in 1959. At Yale he was in Timothy Dwight College and served as Chairman of WYBC, the college's student radio station. In 1963, Ellis graduated with distinction from Harvard Business School, which Ellis credits with being “the transforming experience” in his early life. Ellis went to work for the Rockefeller family office and began a Ph.D. program in Financial Economics at New York University, which he would complete over the following years.

== Early career ==
After a brief stint with WGBH, Boston's public radio station, and then serving in the Army, Ellis began work with the Rockefeller family investments office. In 1966, he joined Donaldson, Lufkin & Jenrette. Through his experience there, he developed the concept for Greenwich Associates, which he founded in 1972. During his 30 years as Managing Partner, Greenwich Associates grew to serve the leading firms in over 130 financial markets around the world with their widely recognized proprietary research.

== Investment strategy ==
In 1975, Ellis authored the article "The Loser's Game" in the Financial Analysts Journal. The article went on to win the Graham & Dodd award in 1977, and in it Ellis argued:

The investment management business (it should be a profession but is not) is built upon a simple and basic belief: Professional money managers can beat the market. That premise appears to be false.

Instead, Ellis advocated a strategy of diversified low-cost index fund investing, and he expanded on this approach in his book Winning the Loser's Game. Ellis went on to write dozens of books and articles on investing, including: The Partnership: The Making of Goldman Sachs, What It Takes, a study of great professional firms, and Rethinking Investing: A Very Short Guide to Very Long-term Investing.

== Teaching and university service ==
Ellis was appointed twice to the faculty of the Harvard Business School in 1970 and 1974 and to the Yale School of Management in 1986. At both Harvard and Yale, he taught advanced courses on investment management.

Ellis served as a successor trustee of Yale University from 1997 to 2008, where he chaired the university's investment committee for nine years alongside Chief Investment Officer David Swensen. He received the Yale Medal in 2009 for his service to the university.

He has served on the board of directors of the Harvard Business School and received the school's alumni award for lifelong service in 1993.

== Public, civic and board service ==
Ellis served as chair of the board of the Institute of Chartered Financial Analysts and as of 2019, is one of only fifteen people recognized by the CFA Institute for lifetime contributions to the investment profession. He has also served as a trustee of Phillips Exeter Academy and Eagle Hill School, and as an Overseer of the Stern Schools of Business at New York University.

After stepping down from Greenwich Associates, Ellis served as a director or advisor to numerous organizations. He served as a director of the Vanguard Group from 2001 to 2009, and also as a trustee of the Robert Wood Johnson Foundation. He was managing partner of The Partners of ’63, a pro bono partnership of Harvard Business School classmates and associates, which supported entrepreneurship in education. Internationally, Ellis has served as an advisor to the GIC of Singapore, as well as to the “future funds” of New Zealand and Australia.

He currently serves as chair of the Board of Directors of Whitehead Institute for Biomedical Research as well as chair of the Board of Directors of Essentia Analytics. Additionally, he serves on the advisory boards of Wealthfront, Rebalance, The Water Company, GeoSynFuels, and IMDx. In addition, he has on the boards of the Long Wharf Theatre and a number of regional Connecticut organizations.

== Personal life ==
Ellis is married to Linda Koch Lorimer, Vice President of Global and Strategic Initiatives at Yale University and together they have four grown children.

== Publications ==
=== Books ===
- Ellis, Charles D. (2025). Rethinking Investing: A Very Short Guide to Very Long-term Investing
- Ellis, Charles D. (2021). Winning the Loser's Game: Timeless Strategies for Successful Investing (8th ed.). McGraw Hill. ISBN 978-1264258468.
- Malkiel, Burton G.; Ellis, Charles D. (2021). The Elements of Investing: Easy Lessons for Every Investor (10th ed.). Wiley. ISBN 978-1119851417.
- Ellis, Charles D. (2016). The Index Revolution: Why Investors Should Join It Now. Wiley. ISBN 978-1119313076.
- Ellis, Charles D.; Munnell, Alicia H.; Eschtruth, Andrew D. (2014). Falling Short: The Coming Retirement Crisis and What to Do About It. Oxford University Press. ISBN 978-0190218898.
- Ellis, Charles D. (2009). The Partnership: The Making of Goldman Sachs. Penguin Books. ISBN 978-0143116127.

=== Journal articles ===
- Ellis, Charles D. (1975). "The Loser's Game". Financial Analysts Journal. 31 (4): 19–26.
