= Enhanced indexing =

In finance, enhanced indexing is any indexing strategy employed with the intention of outperforming strict indexing. Enhanced indexing attempts to generate modest excess returns compared to traditional index funds and other passive management techniques.

== Features ==
Enhanced indexing combines elements of passive management and active management.

Enhanced indexing resembles passive management because enhanced index managers cannot (in principle) deviate significantly from commercially available indices which are derived from statistical bureaus like S&P Dow Jones Indices or FTSE Russell. Enhanced indexing strategies usually have low turnover and lower fees than actively managed portfolios.

However, enhanced indexing partially resembles active management because it allows managers the latitude to deviate from an underlying index. These deviations can be used to minimize transaction costs and turnover, or to maximize tax efficiency.

== Strategies ==
Enhanced indexing comprises a wide range of strategies:

- Enhanced cash - Enhanced cash managers use futures to replicate the index, then they take the roughly 95% of the capital left after buying futures (with their inherent 20 to 1 leverage) and purchase fixed income securities. The key to performance in these strategies is that the yield on the fixed income strategies is greater than the yield that is priced into the futures contracts (for the leverage).
- Index construction enhancements – Instead of relying on external indexes created by third parties like S&P or Dow Jones, enhanced indexes often use proprietary indexes. Alternatively, they use dynamic rather than static indexes.
- Exclusion rules – By using additional filters, some enhanced indexes eliminate securities likely to reduce performance that would be otherwise included in traditional indices (e.g. companies with excessive debt or those in bankruptcy).
- Trading enhancements – Utilizing intelligent trading algorithms, some enhanced index funds create value through trading (e.g. by buying illiquid positions at a discount or by selling more patiently than traditional index funds).
- Portfolio construction enhancements – Enhanced index funds sometimes implement hold ranges that reduce portfolio turnover by allowing funds to hold positions during buffer periods even after traditional sell signals are triggered.
- Tax-managed strategies – Among the newest enhancements, tax-managed index funds manage buys and sells to reduce taxes for investors. This strategy is most useful for investors who hold the investment outside of a tax-advantaged account, like a 401(k) or 529 plan.

== Performance ==
The success of enhanced indexing is likely correlated to the degree of extra cost running an enhanced index fund. Tax-managed strategies are not expensive to implement, while the active management strategies would incur a higher cost structure.

== See also ==
- Relative return
