= Market sentiment =

General attitude of investors to market price development

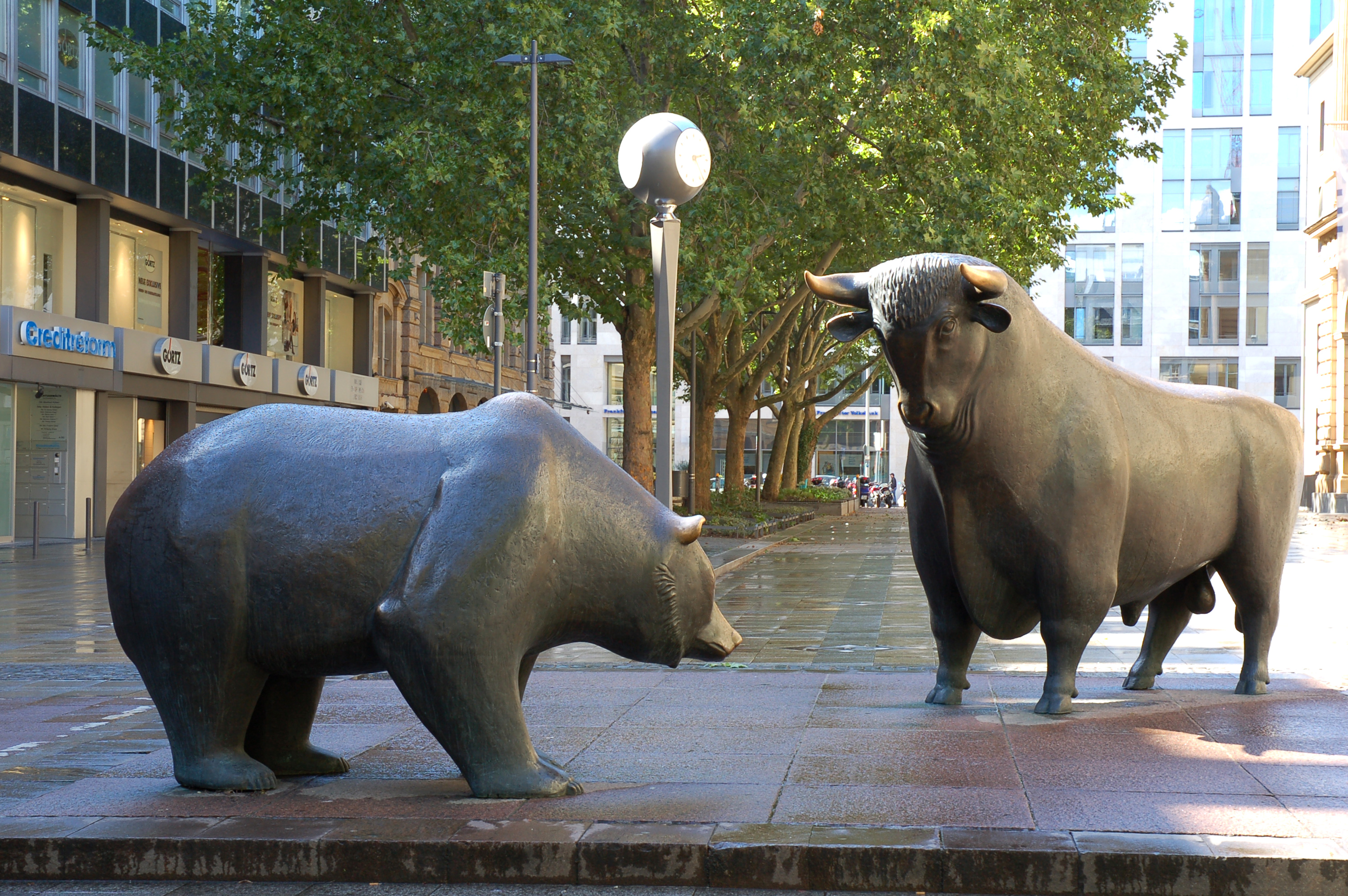
An investor is bullish when they see upward stock trends and bearish when the market is going down. A bull uses its horns in an upward motion to attack and a bear uses its claws in a downward motion to attack. Statue by Reinhard Dachlauer in front of the Frankfurt Stock Exchange.

Market sentiment, also known as investor attention, is the general prevailing attitude of investors as to anticipated price development in a market. This attitude is the accumulation of a variety of fundamental and technical factors, including price history, economic reports, seasonal factors, and national and world events. If investors expect upward price movement in the stock market, the sentiment is said to be bullish. On the contrary, if the market sentiment is bearish, most investors expect downward price movement. Market participants who maintain a static sentiment, regardless of market conditions, are described as permabulls and permabears respectively. Market sentiment is usually considered as a contrarian indicator: what most people expect is a good thing to bet against. Market sentiment is used because it is believed to be a good predictor of market moves, especially when it is more extreme. Very bearish sentiment is usually followed by the market going up more than normal, and vice versa. A bull market refers to a sustained period of either realized or expected price rises, whereas a bear market is used to describe when an index or stock has fallen 20% or more from a recent high for a sustained length of time.

Market sentiment is monitored with a variety of technical and statistical methods such as the number of advancing versus declining stocks and new highs versus new lows comparisons. A large share of the overall movement of an individual stock has been attributed to market sentiment. The stock market's demonstration of the situation is often described as all boats float or sink with the tide, in the popular Wall Street phrase "the trend is your friend". In the last decade, investors are also known to measure market sentiment through the use of news analytics, which include sentiment analysis on textual stories about companies and sectors.

== Theory of investor attention ==
A particular thread of scientific literature connects results from behavioural finance, changes of investor attention on financial markets, and fundamental principles of asset pricing: Barberis et al. (1998), Barberis & Thaler (2003), and Baker & Wurgler (2007). The authors argue that behavioural patterns of retail investors have a significant impact on market returns. At least five main approaches to measuring investor attention are known today in scientific literature: financial market-based measures, survey-based sentiment indexes, textual sentiment data from specialized on-line resources, Internet search behavior, and non-economic factors.

=== First approach ===
According to the first approach, investor attention can be approximated with particular financial market-based measures. According to Gervais et al. (2001) and Hou et al. (2009), trading volume is a good proxy for investor sentiment. High (low) trading volume on a particular stock leads to appreciating (depreciating) of its price. Extreme one-day returns are also reported to draw investors' attention (Barber & Odean (2008)). Noise traders tend to buy (sell) stocks with high (low) returns. Whaley (2001) and Baker & Wurgler (2007) suggest Chicago Board Options Exchange (CBOE) Volatility Index (VIX) as an alternative market sentiment measure. Credit Suisse Fear Barometer (CSFB) is based on prices of zero-premium collars that expire in three months. This index is sometimes used as an alternative to VIX index. The Acertus Market Sentiment Indicator (AMSI) incorporates five variables (in descending order of weight in the indicator): Price/Earnings Ratio (a measure of stock market valuations); price momentum (a measure of market psychology); Realized Volatility (a measure of recent historical risk); High Yield Bond Returns (a measure of credit risk); and the TED spread (a measure of systemic financial risk). Each of these factors provides a measure of market sentiment through a unique lens, and together they may offer a more robust indicator of market sentiment. Closed-end fund discount (the case when net asset value of a mutual fund does not equal to its market price) reported to be possible measure of investor attention (Zweig (1973) and Lee et al. (1991)).

The studies suggest that changes in discounts of closed-end funds are highly correlated with fluctuations in investor sentiment. Brown et al. (2003) investigate daily mutual fund flow as possible measure of investor attention. According to Da et al. (2014), "...individual investors switch from equity funds to bond funds when negative sentiment is high." Dividend premium (the difference between the average book-to-market ratios of dividend paying and not paying stocks) potentially can be a good predictor for investor sentiment (Baker & Wurgler (2004) and Vieira (2011)). Retail investor trades data is also reported to be able to represent investor attention (Kumar & Lee (2006)). The study shows that retail investor transactions "...are systematically correlated — that is, individuals buy (or sell) stocks in concert". Initial public offering (IPO) of a company generates a big amount of information that can potentially be used to proxy investor sentiment. Ljungqvist et al. (2006) and Baker & Wurgler (2007) report IPO first-day returns and IPO volume the most promising candidates for predicting investor attention to a particular stock. It is not surprising that high investments in advertisement of a particular company results in a higher investor attention to corresponding stock (Grullon et al. (2004)). The authors in Chemmanur & Yan (2009) provide an evidence that "...a greater amount of advertising is associated with a larger stock return in the advertising year but a smaller stock return in the year subsequent to the advertising year". Equity issues over total new issues ratio, insider trading data, and other financial indicators are reported in Baker & Wurgler (2007) to be useful in investor attention measurement procedure.

The aforementioned market-based measures have one important drawback. In particular, according to Da et al. (2014): "Although market-based measures have the advantage of being readily available at a relatively high frequency, they have the disadvantage of being the equilibrium outcome of many economic forces other than investor sentiment." In other words, one can never be sure that a particular market-based indicator was driven due to investor attention. Moreover, some indicators can work pro-cyclical. For example, a high trading volume can draw an investor attention. As a result, the trading volume grows even higher. This, in turn, leads to even bigger investor attention. Overall, market-based indicators are playing a very important role in measuring investor attention. However, an investor should always try to make sure that no other variables can drive the result.

=== Second way ===
The second way to proxy for investor attention can be to use survey-based sentiment indexes. Among most known indexes should be mentioned University of Michigan Consumer Sentiment Index, The Conference Board Consumer Confidence Index, and UBS/Gallup Index of Investor Optimism. The University of Michigan Consumer Sentiment Index is based on at least 500 telephone interviews. The survey contains fifty core questions. The Consumer Confidence Index has ten times more respondents (5000 households). However, the survey consists of only five main questions concerning business, employment, and income conditions. The questions can be answered with only three options: "positive", "negative" or "neutral". A sample of 1000 households with total investments equal or higher than $10,000 are interviewed to construct UBS/Gallup Index of Investor Optimism. Mentioned above survey-based sentiment indexes were reported to be good predictors for financial market indicators (Brown & Cliff (2005)). However, according to Da et al. (2014), using such sentiment indexes can have significant restrictions. First, most of the survey-based data sets are available at weekly or monthly frequency. At the same time, most of the alternative sentiment measures are available at a daily frequency. Second, there is a little incentive for respondents to answer question in such surveys carefully and truthfully (Singer (2002)). To sum up, survey-based sentiment indexes can be helpful in predicting financial indicators. However, the usage of such indexes has specific drawbacks and can be limited in some cases.

=== Third direction ===
In the 1920s, the market sentiment of railway companies was bullish as it was a new market, and investors saw long-term prospects.

Under the third direction, researchers propose to use text mining and sentiment analysis algorithms to extract information about investors' mood from social networks, media platforms, blogs, newspaper articles, and other relevant sources of textual data (sometimes referred as news analytics). A thread of publications (Barber & Odean (2008), Dougal et al. (2012), and Ahern & Sosyura (2015)) report a significant influence of financial articles and sensational news on behavior of stock prices. It is also not surprising, that such popular sources of news as Wall Street Journal, New York Times or Financial Times have a profound influence on the market. The strength of the impact can vary between different columnists even inside a particular journal (Dougal et al. (2012)). Tetlock (2007) suggests a successful measure of investors' mood by counting the number of "negative" words in a popular Wall Street Journal column "Abreast of the market". Zhang et al. (2011) and Bollen et al. (2011) report Twitter to be an extremely important source of sentiment data, which helps to predict stock prices and volatility. The usual way to analyze the influence of the data from micro-blogging platforms on behavior of stock prices is to construct special mood tracking indexes.

The easiest way would be to count the number of "positive" and "negative" words in each relevant tweet and construct a combined indicator based on this data. Nasseri et al. (2014) reports the predictive power of StockTwits (Twitter-like platform specialized on exchanging trading-related opinions) data with respect to behavior of stock prices. An alternative, but more demanding, way is to engage human experts to annotate a large number of tweets with the expected stock moves, and then construct a machine learning model for prediction. The application of the event study methodology to Twitter mood shows significant correlation to cumulative abnormal returns (Sprenger et al. (2014), Ranco et al. (2015), Gabrovšek et al. (2017)). Karabulut (2013) reports Facebook to be a good source of information about investors' mood. Overall, most popular social networks, finance-related media platforms, magazines, and journals can be a valuable source of sentiment data, summarized in Peterson (2016). However, important to notice that it is relatively more difficult to collect such type of data (in most cases a researcher needs a special software). In addition, analysis of such data can also require deep machine learning and data mining knowledge (Hotho et al. (2005)).

=== Fourth road ===
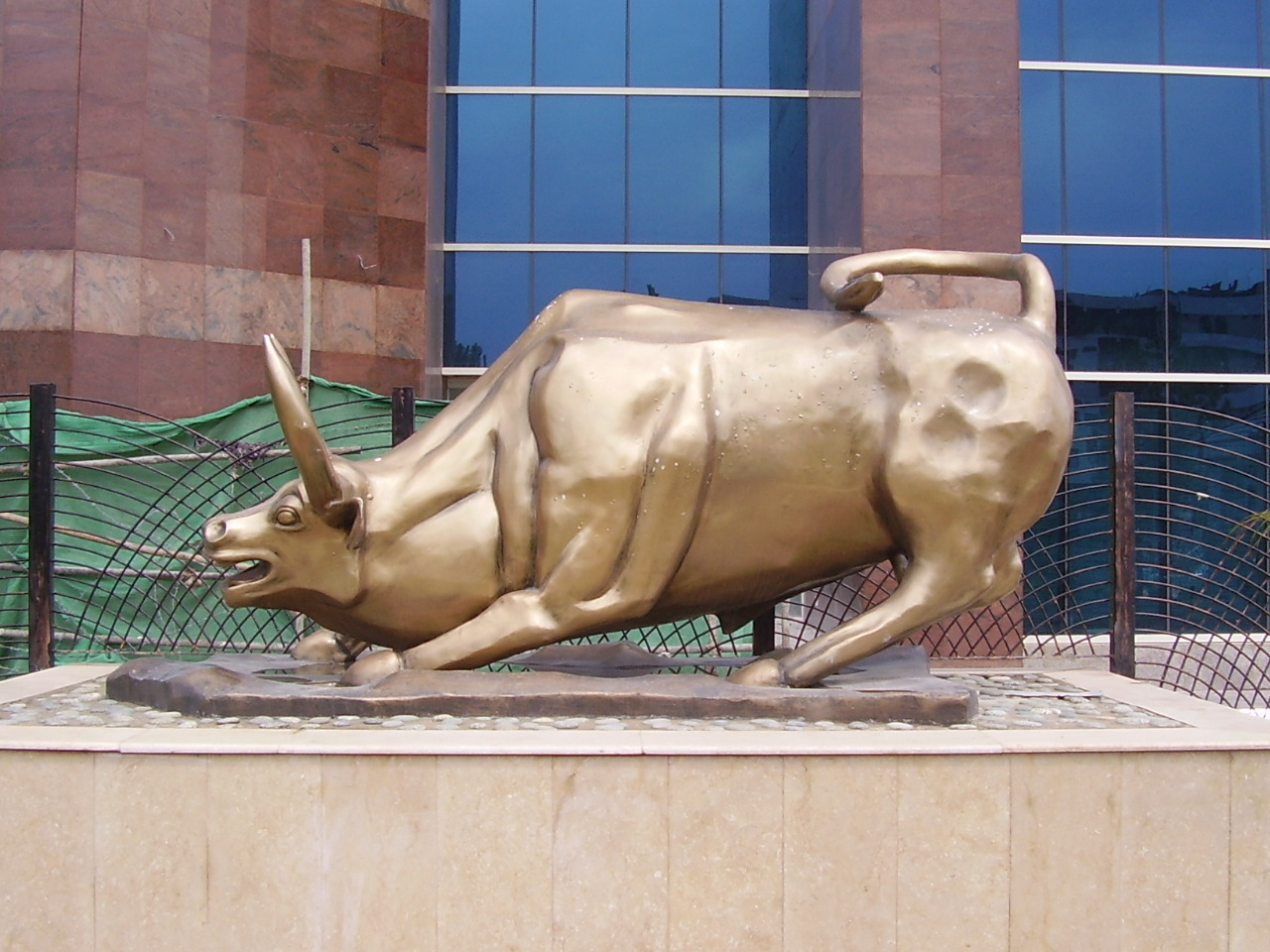
Islamabad Stock Exchange Bull

The fourth road is an important source of information about investor attention is the Internet search behavior of households. This approach is supported by results from Simon (1955), who concludes that people start their decision making process by gathering relevant information. Publicly available data on search volumes for most Internet search services starts from the year 2004. Since that time many authors showed the usefulness of such data in predicting investor attention and market returns (Da et al. (2014), Preis et al. (2013), and Curme et al. (2014)). Most studies are using Google Trends (GT) service in order to extract search volume data and investigate investor attention. The usefulness of Internet search data was also proved based on Yahoo! Corporation data (Bordino et al. (2012)). The application of Internet search data gives promising results in solving different financial problems. The authors in Kristoufek (2013b) discuss the application of GT data in portfolio diversification problem. Proposed in the paper diversification procedure is based on the assumption that the popularity of a particular stock in Internet queries is correlated with the riskiness of this stock. The author reports that such diversification procedure helps significantly improve portfolio returns. Da et al. (2014) and Dimpfl & Jank (2015) investigate a predictive power of GT data for two most popular volatility measures: realized volatility (RV) and CBOE daily market volatility index (VIX). Both studies report positive and significant dependence between Internet search data and volatility measures. Bordino et al. (2012) and Preis et al. (2010) reveal the ability of Internet search data to predict trading volumes in the US stock markets. According to Bordino et al. (2012), "...query volumes anticipate in many cases peaks of trading by one day or more." Some researchers find the usefulness of GT data in predicting volatility on foreign currency market (Smith (2012)). An increasingly important role of Internet search data is admitted in cryptocurrency (e.g. Bitcoin) prices forecasting (Kristoufek (2013a)). Google Trends data is also reported to be a good predictor for daily mutual fund flows. Da et al. (2014) concludes that such type of sentiment data "...has significant incremental predictive power for future daily fund flow innovations of both equity and bond funds." One more promising source of Internet search data is the number of visits of finance-related Wikipedia pages (Wikipedia page statistics) (Moat et al. (2013) and Kristoufek (2013a)). To sum up, the Internet search behavior of households is relatively new and promising proxy for investor attention. Such type of sentiment data does not require additional information from other sources and can be used in scientific studies independently.

=== Fifth source ===
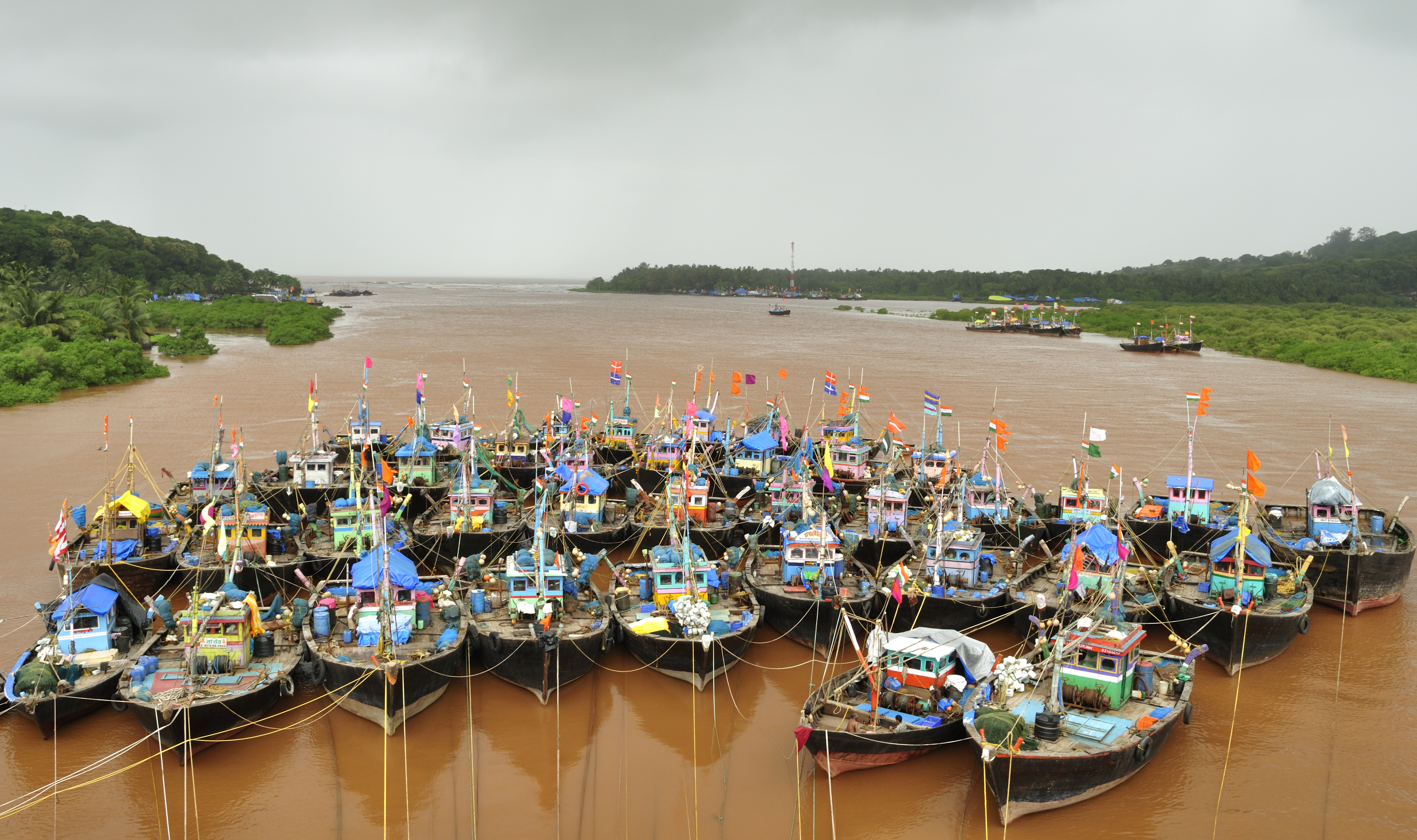
"All boats float or sink with the tide."

Finally the fifth source of investor attention can also depend on some non-economic factors. Every day many non-economic events (e.g. news, weather, health condition, etc.) influence our mood, which, in term, influence the level of our risk aversion and trading behavior. Edmans et al. (2007) discuss the influence of sport events on investors' trading behavior. The authors report a strong evidence of abnormally negative stock returns after losses in major soccer competitions. The loss effect is also valid after international cricket, rugby, and basketball games. However, Abudy, Mugerman and Shust (2022) document a positive stock market reaction following a victory in the Eurovision song contest. This positive effect is documented in the winning country. The authors attribute this finding to the competition structure: unlike sports tournaments that highlight the loss, the structure of the Eurovision song contest highlights the winner. Kaplanski & Levy (2010) investigate the influence of bad news (aviation disasters) on stock prices. The authors conclude that a bad piece of news (e.g. about aviation disaster) can cause significant drop in stock returns (especially for small and risky stocks). The evidence that the number of sunlight minutes in a particular day influence the behavior of a trader is presented in Akhtari (2011) and Hirshleifer & Shumway (2003). The authors conclude that the "sunshine effect" is statistically significant and robust to different model specifications. The influence of temperature on stock returns is discussed in Cao & Wei (2005).

According to the results in the mentioned study, there is a negative dependence between temperature and stock returns on the whole range of temperature (i.e. the returns are higher when the weather is cold). A seasonal affective disorder (SAD) is also known to be a predictor of investors' mood (Kamstra et al. (2003)). This is an expected result because SAD incorporates the information about weather conditions. Some researchers go even further and reveal the dependence between lunar phases and stock market returns (Yuan et al. (2006)). According to Dichev & Janes (2001): "...returns in the 15 days around new moon dates are about double the returns in the 15 days around full moon dates". Even geomagnetic activity is reported to have an influence (negatively correlated) on stock returns (C. Robotti (2003). To sum up, non-economic events have a significant influence on trader's behavior. An investor would expect high market returns on a sunny, but cool day, fifteen days around a new moon, with no significant geomagnetic activity, preferably the day after a victory on a significant sport event. In most cases such data should be treated as supplemental in measuring investor attention, but not as totally independent one.

== Currency markets ==
Additional indicators exist to measure the sentiment specifically on Forex markets. Though the Forex market is decentralized (not traded on a central exchange), various retail Forex brokerage firms publish positioning ratios (similar to the Put/Call ratio) and other data regarding their own clients' trading behavior. Since most retail currency traders are unsuccessful, measures of Forex market sentiment are typically used as contrarian indicators. Some researchers report Internet search data (e.g. Google Trends) to be useful in predicting volatility on foreign currency markets. Internet search data and (relevant) Wikipedia page views data are reported to be useful in cryptocurrency (e.g. Bitcoin) prices forecasting.

== See also ==
- Acertus Market Sentiment Indicator (AMSI)
- Market trend
- Pivot point (stock market)
- Sentiment analysis
- Behavioral economics
- Behavioral portfolio theory
- Behavioral Strategy
