= Julia Wood =

Julia Wood may refer to:

- Julia A. A. Wood (pen name, Minnie Mary Lee; 1825-1903), American writer
- Julia A. Wood (1840-1927), American writer
- Julia T. Wood, American academic

== See also ==
- Julie Wood, Franco-Belgian comics series
- Juli Wood, Finnish-American saxophonist, vocalist and composer
- Julian Wood, English cricketer
