= Linda Lorimer =

American lawyer

Vice President for Global and Strategic Initiatives (and other positions) at Yale University
- In office 1978 – 1986, 1993 – 2015

President of Randolph–Macon Woman's College
- In office 1986–1993

Personal details
- Spouse: Charles Ellis
- Education: Hollins University; Yale University

Linda Koch Lorimer was Vice President for Global and Strategic Initiatives at Yale University, where she was responsible for an array of administrative departments. She developed and oversaw Yale's Office of International Affairs and created its Office of Digital Dissemination, which takes the administrative lead in sharing the university's intellectual treasury around the world. She is also the university officer responsible for the Office of Public Affairs and Communications, the Yale Broadcast Center, and the Yale University Press. She serves a liaison to the Association of Yale Alumni.

Lorimer has served in a number of roles in the Yale administration and as President of Randolph-Macon Woman's College, now called Randolph College. She holds positions on numerous boards, including having served as board chair of the Association of American Colleges and Universities and vice-chair of the World Economic Forum's Global Agenda Council on "The Future of Universities."

== Early life and education ==
A 1970 graduate of Norfolk Academy, Lorimer graduated from Hollins University in 1974 as valedictorian and was student body president. She graduated from Yale Law School in 1977. While at Yale, she received the Wasserman Leadership Award. Lorimer practiced law in New York City for a year at Davis Polk & Wardwell before returning to Yale as Assistant General Counsel.

== Early work at Yale and Randolph-Macon ==
Lorimer held a series of administrative positions at Yale between 1978 and 1986, including service as the youngest Associate Provost in the university's history. Then University President and eventual Major League Baseball Commissioner A. Bartlett Giamatti praised Lorimer as Yale's "utility infielder," and wrote in 1983 that "no one has served Yale better in her time."

From 1986 to 1993, Lorimer served as President of Randolph–Macon Woman's College in her home state of Virginia, where she helped the college regain financial stability, boost enrollment, and complete a successful capital campaign.

== Later Yale work ==
Lorimer was a member of the Yale Corporation, the university's governing board, from 1990 to 1993. At the request of newly elected University President Richard Levin, Lorimer returned to Yale in 1993 to serve as Secretary of the Yale Corporation — a position she held until 2012. Her portfolio has grown extensively over the years. She became Secretary and Vice President in 1995 and was appointed Vice President of the university in 2012. Levin has described her as his "strategic partner from the first day" of his presidency and the "best operating executive" he's ever seen.

Lorimer has been responsible for the growth and development of a variety of initiatives for Yale, including the launch of the Office of New Haven Affairs, the Tercentennial Initiative, the Office of International Affairs, and the Office of Digital Dissemination.

In recent years, she helped to develop an ambitious strategy and numerous programs for internationalizing Yale. At Yale's Office of International Affairs, Lorimer continues to oversee the support of all of Yale's efforts to pursue strategic partnerships abroad, and is the liaison to Yale's Office of International Students and Scholars. She is also responsible for many administrative services including Yale's public affairs and communications efforts, the Broadcast Center, the Office of Digital Dissemination, the Yale Press as well as alumni relations.

Lorimer was instrumental in initiating Yale's efforts to contribute to the revitalization of the city of New Haven. Currently, she is guiding Yale's use of digital technology to disseminate the university's intellectual treasury more extensively in the United States and around the world. For several years, she assumed oversight of Yale's sustainability initiative in an effort to further the university's goal of becoming a model of best practices for sustainability by universities.

Lorimer received the Yale Medal in 2009.

== Board service and awards ==
Lorimer has been a leader of numerous nonprofit and corporate enterprises. She was Chair of the Board of the Association of American Colleges and Universities, Vice Chair of the Board of the Center for Creative Leadership, Chair of the Board of the Women's College Coalition, Vice Chair of the National Association of Methodist Colleges and Universities, and a member of the boards of regional community and arts organizations. She has given board service to all of her alma maters. She joined the Save the Children board in 2012.

Lorimer was formerly a director of Sprint, Centel and First Colony Life Insurance Company, and she currently serves on the board of McGraw Hill Financial, having served as the Lead Director for five years. She was appointed a Director of Pearson PLC in 2013.

Lorimer was awarded the Order of Merit by the Government of Argentina in 2003 for advancing international education. She received the Sandra Day O'Connor Award by the American Bar Association for board excellence in 2008. She has received four honorary degrees for her efforts to advance women. She was inducted into the Connecticut Women's Hall of Fame in 2013. She is a member of the Connecticut Academy of Arts and Sciences.

== Personal life ==
Lorimer is married to Charles Ellis, founder of Greenwich Associates, who has been a consultant for companies, foundations, and governmental agencies and served for over a decade as a member of the Yale Corporation. She has two children and two stepchildren.
