= Paul Cebar =

American musician

Paul Cebar (born 1956) is an American songwriter, singer, guitarist, and bandleader from Milwaukee, Wisconsin, who plays African, Latin American and Caribbean music. He has released four albums and an EP with his band, Paul Cebar & the Milwaukeeans, which received airplay from adult album alternative stations across the US. Cebar has also released a solo album and albums with his other bands, including the latest incarnation, Paul Cebar & Tomorrow Sound.

In 2016, Cebar toured with singer-songwriters Peter Mulvey and Willy Porter as Peter, Paul, and Willy. He also performed tour dates with two of his past bands, including the revived R&B Cadets. He is the godfather of Teresa Sanfilippo.

== Early life ==
Cebar recounts his musical journey beginning as an 11-year-old in the 1960s when he attended Milwaukee's Lakefront Festival of the Arts where he saw the Wild Magnolias from New Orleans as well as drummer Babatunde Olatunji and fell in love with the style and sound.

Cebar graduated from Pius XI High School in Milwaukee and began performing in coffeehouses on the local folk scene in the mid-1970s. He first fell in love with New Orleans' music scene on a 1977 road trip. He has continued to return every year to the Jazz & Heritage Festival.

His repertoire consisted in large part of rhythm and blues and jump blues songs, played solo on his guitar. He attended New College in Sarasota, Florida. Afterward, he played in New York City while working with the R&B Cadets in Milwaukee.

== The R&B Cadets ==
Throughout the early 1980s, Cebar was a member of a rock and R&B combo, The R&B Cadets, with Jon Sieger, Mike Sieger, Robyn Pluer, Bob Jennings, Juli Wood, and Bob Schneider. The band played Sieger's compositions along with obscure songs from the mid-20th century that Cebar had unearthed.

The R&B Cadets released an album titled Top Happy in 1986, and a 7-inch 33 1/3 titled Get a Move On in 1981, including the song "Hook, Line, and Sinker", "One Is Green", "Headin' for the Poor House" and "Down by the River". During this period, Cebar and Claudia Schmidt released a 7-inch 45 "The Outskirts Of You" b/w "Baby, It's Cold Outside".

== Paul Cebar & The Milwaukeeans ==
Parallel to his work with the R&B Cadets, Cebar had his own group, Paul Cebar and the Milwaukeeans. The group played many R&B, jazz, and bebop songs, by Louis Jordan, Duke Ellington, Ella Fitzgerald, Billie Holiday and others. The members were Cebar (acoustic guitar and vocals), Robin Pluer (vocals), Rip Tenor (saxophone) and Alan Anderson (bass guitar). They were often joined by percussionist Guy Hoffman.

After the Cadets disbanded in 1986, Cebar reconstituted the group, which then was made up of Cebar (guitar, vocals), Pluer (vocals), Juli Wood (saxophone), Anderson (bass guitar), Tenor (saxophone) and Randy Baugher (drums). The band explored African, Latin American, and Caribbean sounds in a rhythm and blues context.

The band gradually expanded into a unique R&B/Worldbeat fusion in the late 80s with horn section (Juli Wood, Tony Jarvis, Greg Tardy, Paul Scher), keyboard/accordion (Robin Pluer), lead guitar/lap steel (Peter Roller, Rob Gjersoe) and continuing Milwaukeeans (Cebar on guitar/vocal, Al Anderson on electric bass, Randy Baugher on drums). The group was popular at clubs in Chicago (Lounge Ax, Fitzgerald's, Cubby Bear) and Minneapolis (Fine Line, Cabooze) and their hometown of Milwaukee. The album best documenting this era is That Unhinged Thing (Shanachie 1993).

Reggie Bordeaux, who still performs with Cebar in his current band Paul Cebar & Tomorrow Sound, was taught drums by his father at an early age. He had much experience when he met Cebar, performing previously with Prince as his lead drummer. Bordeaux's talent combined with his performing experience made him a perfect fit for Cebar's sound. Bordeaux's gospel drumming style brought a unique element to Cebar's already distinctive music. Garrison Keillor commented to Cebar after the band's performance on his show, A Prairie Home Companion: "Mr. Reggie Bordeaux... You got a great percussion section there, mister."

Patrick Patterson was one of the longest acting members of Paul Cebar & The Milwaukeeans, playing electric bass and singing harmony.

Some alumni of the band are: Tony Jarvis, Greg Tardy, and Paul Scher on saxophone; Peter Roller, Rob Gjersoe (Jimmie Dale Gilmore, The Flatlanders), and Terry Vittone on guitar; Mike Kachou, Ethan Bender, and Patrick Patterson on bass; and Michael Walls and Romero Beverly on percussion.

== Paul Cebar & Tomorrow Sound ==
Members include former R&B Cadet Bob Jennings (saxophone, keyboards), Mike Fredrickson (bass guitar), Reggie Bordeaux (drums) and McKinley "Mac" Perkins (percussion). While earlier incarnations of the band were more pop-oriented, the band is heavily into African, Latin, Caribbean, reggae, zydeco, R&B, and soul styles.

The band performs regularly and tours the US.

== Discography ==
- Top Happy - 1986 (R&B Cadets)
- That Unhinged Thing - 1993
- Upstroke for the Downfolk - 1995
- I Can't Dance for You (EP) - 1996
- The Get-Go - 1997
- Suchamuch - 2001 (live album)
- Tomorrow Sound Now for Yes Music People - 2007
- Beacon - 2008 (mostly instrumental duo set from Paul and percussionist Jeffrey Haynes; limited edition)
- One Little Light On - 2009 (solo album)
- Tell Me That Before- 2011 (David Greenberger/Mark Greenberg w/Cebar): Duplex Planet zine-related strangeness)
- They like me around here - 2012 (Greenberger/Paul & Tomorrow Sound): ditto
- Fine Rude Thing - 2014
- Paul Cebar - 2025

== Radio ==
Cebar began guesting on local musician Steve Cohen's show on WMSE radio in Milwaukee in the early 1980s. At the suggestion of another DJ there, Cebar applied for and received his own show, which he has hosted since 1985. The show runs on Wednesdays from 9 a.m. to noon. In the late 1980s, Cebar also began hosting a show on Sunday afternoons on WYMS in Milwaukee, which ran until the station changed its format in 2002.
