= Acertus Market Sentiment Indicator =

The Acertus Market Sentiment Indicator (AMSI) is a stock market sentiment indicator that generates monthly sentiment indications ranging from 0 (extreme fear) to 100 (extreme greed). The indicator views sentiment as a continuum with anxiety and complacency representing less extreme and nuanced forms of fear and greed, respectively. Generally, a lower reading (< 20) reflects a market sentiment of fear, while readings of 20-40 represent anxiety. Conversely, a higher reading (>80) suggests significant greed, while readings of 60-80 represent complacency.

AMSI is constructed using five variables. In descending order of weight they are: Price/Earnings Ratio, a measure of stock market valuations; Price Momentum, a measure of market psychology; Realized Volatility, a measure of recent historical risk; High Yield Bond Returns, a measure of credit risk; and the TED spread, a measure of systemic financial risk. Each of these factors provides a measure of market sentiment through a unique lens, and weighted together they may offer a more robust indicator of market sentiment.

AMSI is a dynamic and self-adjusting index, with the relative weights of its individual components, which are proprietary, being rebalanced on a quarterly basis. AMSI was officially launched in December 2013, but its historical values span the period from January 1986 to the present, which is the longest common period for which data for all component elements is available.

Tracking AMSI on a regular basis may provide a more robust measure of market sentiment than the VIX, the put/call ratio or other single variable sentiment indicators. As such, it may help provide a better perspective on, and insight into, the current relationship between the levels of risk and potential return in the market. During periods of extreme readings, it may offer some particular insight into the probable direction of the S&P 500 over the six- to twelve-month period ahead. Since the temptation to abandon long-term investment plans is usually highest at market and sentiment extremes, tracking AMSI on a regular basis can serve as an important guardrail with respect to adherence to investment policy statements and maintenance proper portfolio risk management controls. AMSI, along with commentary on the index, is published within the first business week of each month.

A whitepaper about the AMSI was published in the Journal of Indexes on April 25, 2014.

== See also ==
- Market sentiment
