= The Get-Go =

Studio album by Paul Cebar
- Released: 1997
- Studios: The Junkyard, Milwaukee, Wisconsin
- Genres: R&B, soul
- Label: Don't
- Producers: Jeff Hamilton, Paul Cebar, the Milwaukeeans

Paul Cebar chronology
I Can't Dance for You EP (1996)	The Get-Go (1997)	Suchamuch (2001)

The Get-Go is an album by the American musician Paul Cebar, released in 1997. Although not credited on the album cover, Cebar was backed by his band, the Milwaukeeans. The first single was "She Found a Fool". It was a hit on adult album alternative radio.

== Production ==
The album was produced by Jeff Hamilton, Cebar, and the Milwaukeeans. It was recorded at The Junkyard, in Milwaukee, Wisconsin. The studio was located next to a junkyard; the musicians took some auto parts for added percussion. A musicologist, Cebar incorporated many different musical styles in to the album's sound; Cebar considered it to be dance music.

== Critical reception ==
Professional ratings
Review scores
Source	Rating
AllMusic	4.5/5 stars
The Atlanta Journal-Constitution	B+
MusicHound Rock: The Essential Album Guide	3/5 stars
Orlando Sentinel	4/5 stars
Philadelphia Daily News	B

The Washington Post thought that, "for all the obvious delight [Cebar] takes in celebrating older pop traditions, he never cheapens the music with false emotion." The Orlando Sentinel called "She Found a Fool" "a classic horn-fueled, Memphis-style soul tune, with glistening guitar lines that show an African pop influence." The Philadelphia Daily News labeled Cebar "Southside Johnny with more finesse, or a male equivalent of Bonnie Raitt."

Billboard stated that The Get-Go "explores an almost bewildering variety of styles: Motown soul, Memphis RB, gutbucket blues, New Orleans funk, Jamaican reggae, even Brazilian samba." The Star Tribune concluded that "the low-key, atypical tunes—the love-lorn reggae song 'Trying', the Delta-flavored blues groove 'Keep You' or the oddly romantic cantina ballad 'Spacelab Girls from Huntsville'—cut the deepest." The Daily Herald opined that the album's "encyclopedic range of soul burners, Cajun numbers, R&B stomps and reggae is breathtaking." The Dallas Observer listed The Get-Go as one of the best "obscure" albums of 1997.

AllMusic wrote: "Dabbling in flavors of brassy R&B, calypso, reggae, ragtime and blue-eyed soul, Cebar delivers an album filled with winning original tunes."

== Track listing ==
No.	Title	Length
1.	"She Found a Fool"
2.	"Don't Let It Pour"
3.	"Bungalowing Big Time"
4.	"Trying"
5.	"Clap for the Couple"
6.	"Keep You (Going Away)"
7.	"He Forgot What He Knew"
8.	"Got to Grind"
9.	"Sending My Love"
10.	"Spacelab Girls from Huntsville"
11.	"Lovely as the Day Is Long"
12.	"Wasabi"
13.	"Itta Bena Boy"
14.	"Lovely as the Day Is Long (reprise)"
