= H2O Asset Management =

- Company type: Private
- Industry: Asset management
- Founded: 2010
- Founder: Bruno Crastes
- Headquarters: London, United Kingdom
- Key people: Bruno Crastes (CEO)
- AUM: €22 billion (2024)
- Website: www.h2o-am.com

H2O Asset Management is a London-based asset management firm specializing in global macro and fixed-income strategies. Founded in 2010 by Bruno Crastes, the firm manages approximately €22 billion in assets as of 2024.

Known for its high-conviction, high-risk investment approach, H2O has faced significant challenges due to its exposure to illiquid assets tied to financier Lars Windhorst and subsequent regulatory scrutiny.

== History ==
H2O Asset Management was established in 2010 by Bruno Crastes, a former portfolio manager at Credit Agricole Asset Management. The firm quickly gained prominence for its global macro funds, such as H2O Multibonds and H2O Adagio, attracting institutional and retail investors. By 2019, H2O managed over €30 billion in assets.

In 2019, H2O faced a major scandal when the Financial Times revealed that up to €1.4 billion of its assets were invested in illiquid securities linked to Lars Windhorst’s businesses, including Tennor Holding. The exposure, which contrasted with the firm’s focus on liquid markets, raised concerns about liquidity risks and due diligence, triggering billions in investor withdrawals. The French Autorité des Marchés Financiers (AMF) intervened in 2020, forcing H2O to suspend subscriptions and redemptions in three French-domiciled funds to protect investors.

To manage the crisis, H2O segregated illiquid assets into side pockets. In 2020, the firm underwent a restructuring, with Natixis Investment Managers, a minority shareholder, selling its stake to H2O’s management in 2021. Regulatory scrutiny continued, with the AMF fining H2O and its executives €15 million in 2023 for breaches related to Tennor investments. By 2024, H2O had repaid €70 million to investors trapped in side-pocketed funds, with the UK’s Financial Conduct Authority mandating a total repayment of $273 million.
