= Juli Wood =

- Genres: Cool jazz; bossa nova; bebop; rhythm and blues
- Instruments: Voice; tenor saxophone; alto saxophone; baritone saxophone
- Label: OA2 Records
- Formerly of: R&B Cadets; Paul Cebar & the Milwaukeeans; Mrs. Fun; Big Bari Band
- Website: JuliWoodSax.com

Juli Wood is a Finnish-American saxophonist, vocalist, composer, and band-leader from Chicago, who appears regularly in Chicago and Milwaukee area jazz clubs, on tours through the Midwest with the Juli Wood Quartet and other groups she leads or performs with. She plays soprano, tenor, and baritone saxophones. Wood makes frequent appearances at Scandinavian jazz and blues festivals including Finland's Pori Jazz festival. Wood got her start in Milwaukee with the R&B Cadets, and she gained further exposure with Paul Cebar & the Milwaukeeans—which also featured vocalists Robyn Plue and Paul Cebar—who toured between Milwaukee, Chicago, and Minneapolis.

Wood plays baritone sax with organist Melvin Rhyne as a quintet on a self-published CD, Movin' and Groovin′. Her CD Blues for Earma Jean was released in November 2004 featuring Chicago pianist Earma Thompson. She plays with Milwaukee area jazz duo Mrs. Fun, and several of her contributions can be heard on The Best of Mrs. Fun (Daemon Records). Wood is a member of Valley of the Dolls with Janet Planet, Connie Grauer, and Kim Zick, who have released an album titled High.

Her 2015 recording Synkkä Metsä (Dark Forest) draws on material from her Finnish heritage. On one of her near-yearly trips to Finland she was listening to jazz trumpeter Art Farmer's recording of Swedish folk songs, To Sweden with Love (1964), and decided to record "simple and hauntingly beautiful Finnish folk songs, instrumentally and in a jazz style." She was named the Finlandia Foundation Performer of the Year for 2018. The foundation awarded her two grants: the first to research and produce a follow-up to Synkkä Metsä; the other for traveling the USA performing the Finnish folk songs in jazz styles.

She has "played many jazz clubs and festivals nationally and internationally; Chicago Jazz Fest, Hyde Park Jazz Fest, Milwaukee's Summerfest, Chicago's main jazz clubs - The Jazz Showcase, Green Mill Cocktail Lounge, Andy's and Katerina's. Skansen Jazz and Blues (Stockholm, Sweden), Pori Jazz Fest (Finland), Bent J's club (Aarhus, Denmark), Storyville (Helsinki, Finland), Arlandia Jazz Fest (Åland) to name a few". In 2018 she debuted Big Bari Band, with both her and fellow saxophonist Rajiv Halim On baritone saxophones.

== Biography ==
Juli Wood's four grandparents immigrated from the Ostrobothnia region in Finland in the early 1900s to Minnesota’s Iron Range and Duluth. She grew up in the Milwaukee, Wisconsin area, her parents instilling Finnish heritage. She became enamored by the saxophone while in grade school: "I remember watching Soul Train as a kid on T.V. in the 70’s and seeing Maceo Parker playing alto sax with James Brown. I thought that was the coolest looking and sounding instrument in the world! So the love affair with the saxophone started in the sixth grade and has been going strong ever since."

In high school she played in her school's concert orchestra as well as marching and jazz bands. After graduating high school in 1977, she visited Finland and made return visits nearly every summer. She briefly attended University of Wisconsin–Milwaukee (UWM) but dropped out to focus on the city's music scene. She soon joined the R&B Cadets with singer Robyn Pluer and John and Mike Sieger, who later broke off to form Semi-Twang. A later version of the Cadets would include Paul Cebar, who had a knack for unearthing obscure jazz pieces that made for great cover songs. In 1983 she returned to UWM, majoring in classical saxophone; there, she found training in the concert and jazz bands invaluable. Around this time until 1987 she gigged with jazz combos throughout Milwaukee. In 1987 she joined Paul Cebar & the Milwaukeeans reuniting with Cebar and Pluer playing danceable rhythm & blues. She had a side project with Pluer and a jazz duo Mrs. Fun called Rhythm Club. Wood was also teaching saxophone to up to forty students during the work week at several venues. The Milwaukeeans would rotate weekends between Chicago, their hometown, and Minneapolis/St. Paul Minnesota, commuting back after playing two or more clubs and events; Wood enjoyed the time but also found the live band was too loud to be sustained. From 1993 for a few years, she turned back to jazz and worked to develop the Juli Wood Quartet.

She trained in jazz at the Wisconsin Conservatory of Music, and has been mentored by jazz musicians she admires. In 1996 she moved to Chicago.
