= Behavioral portfolio theory =

Behavioral portfolio theory (BPT), put forth in 2000 by Shefrin and Statman, provides an alternative to the assumption that the ultimate motivation for investors is the maximization of the value of their portfolios. It suggests that investors have varied aims and create an investment portfolio that meets a broad range of goals. It does not follow the same principles as the capital asset pricing model, modern portfolio theory and the arbitrage pricing theory. A behavioral portfolio bears a strong resemblance to a pyramid with distinct layers. Each layer has well defined goals. The base layer is devised in a way that it is meant to prevent financial disaster, whereas, the upper layer is devised to attempt to maximize returns, an attempt to provide a shot at becoming rich.

BPT is a descriptive theory based on the SP/A theory of Lola Lopes (1987), and closely related to Roy's safety-first criterion. The theory is described as a single account version: BPT-SA, which is very closely related to the SP/A theory.

In this multiple account version, investors can have fragmented portfolios, just as we observe among investors. They even propose in their initial article a Cobb–Douglas utility function that shows how money is allocated in the two mental accounts.

== See also ==
- Market sentiment
