= Absolute Return Trust =

Defunct British investment trust

- Company type: Public
- Traded as: Formerly LSE: ART
- Industry: Investment trust
- Founded: 2005
- Defunct: 2013
- Fate: Liquidated and delisted from the London Stock Exchange
- Headquarters: Guernsey
- Key people: Andrew Sykes (former chairman)
- Products: Absolute return investments

Absolute Return Trust, (a closed-ended investment company incorporated with limited liability under the laws of Guernsey with registered number 42733), previously (LSE: ABR), was a large British investment trust dedicated to achieving an absolute level of return relative to the London Interbank Offered Rate.

== Overview ==
Established in 2005, the company is a former constituent of the FTSE 250 Index. Andrew Sykes was the chairman until November 2013.

The fund was managed by Fauchier Partners Management Limited. The fund was delisted from London Stock Exchange and ceased trading with effect from 19 December 2013. This delisting and cancellation was requested by the company, and it was subsequently liquidated.
