= Passive investor =

Non decision-making investor

A passive investor is one who does not participate in the day-to-day decisions of running a company. In partnerships, such investors may be deemed limited partners rather than general partners. According to Steve Penman, "The passive investor assumes the market is efficient and that stocks are correctly priced to reflect the risk involved in buying the stock." A passive investor relies on the controlling stakeholders and the management to conduct the business of the corporation in such a way as both to maximize its value and to share the upside potential with the passive investor.

== See also ==
- Passive management
