= Trading the news =

Financial trading technique

Trading the news is a technique to trade equities, currencies and other financial instruments on the financial markets. Trading news releases can be a significant tool for financial investors. Economic news reports often spur strong short-term moves in the markets, which may create trading opportunities for traders. Announcements about corporate profits, a change in management, rumors of a merger, are events that can cause a company's share price to move wildly up or down. Interest rates, unemployment and export rates, or the central bank's policy shifts, can cause a deep change of an exchange rate.

Profitable trade on news is feasible only if it can be undertaken before other market participants can react to the same news.

== Methods ==
=== Manual ===
Investors trading shares of a listed company know there are certain events that cause the share price to rise or fall — sudden changes in energy prices, a labor strike at a supplier, a poor month for the sales, for example. Trading the news is the technique of making a profit by trading financial instruments (stock, currency, etc.) just in time, and in accordance to the occurrence of those events.

More precisely, it is necessary to make the trade before other market participants can do so, and before the expectation of the relevant event is capitalised into the market price. This requires either consistently superior insight or access to inside information, trading on which may be illegal.

=== Automatic ===
Event-based algorithmic trading, also known as programmed trading, is not a new phenomenon. This trading technique has been increasing in popularity since the early 2000s. As of 2009, studies suggested high frequency trading (HFT) firms accounted for 60-73% of all US equity trading volume, with that number falling to approximately 50% in 2012. Algorithmic trading allows investors to fine-tune their computers to scan live news feeds and watch for items affecting any listed company. Recent advances in large language models (LLMs) have enabled automated news trading systems that interpret the economic implications of news headlines without task-specific financial training. A study by researchers at the University of Florida found that GPT-4 achieved a 93.3% portfolio hit rate in predicting the direction of the initial market reaction to overnight corporate news headlines.

As with manual methods, it is crucial to trade on new information before others can do so. This fact leads to continue competition in faster methods of high frequency trading.

== Social networks in trading the news ==
In recent years, social networks have become a significant information source that can impact financial markets. Twitter alone provides an enormous opportunity for investors and traders:

- After Elon Musk tweeted about a new product line Tesla's shares leaped by 4% ($1 billion of its market capitalization);
- On August 13, 2013, Carl Icahn tweets about his large stake in Apple Inc. He claims that the company is extremely undervalued and adds that he urges CEO Tim Cook for a larger share buyback. As a result, Apple's shares surged 5% by the end of close on this day.

== See also ==
- News Analytics
- Stock trader
- Trader
