= William E. Grauer =

American lawyer

- Education: Cornell University; Cornell Law School (JD)
- Occupation: Lawyer

William E. Grauer ("Bill Grauer") is a lawyer in New York and California who was for 22 years, from 1988 to 2010, the chair of the Standing Committee on Discipline for the United States District Court for the Southern District of California. He was responsible for supervising discipline cases against attorneys in federal court. He is also a former chair of the Ethics Committee of the San Diego County Bar Association. Until his retirement, Grauer was a partner at the law firm of Cooley LLP specializing in securities litigation and the PSLRA, and has argued cases in the United States Supreme Court, the California Supreme Court and several times in the Circuit Court of Appeals.

Selected by The Los Angeles Daily Journal as one of the top 100 lawyers in California, Grauer was the lead counsel for PacifiCare in the In Re Managed Care Litigation, MDL 1440 (S.D. Fla), one of the largest certified class actions in US history. He was also on the Steering Committee leading the IPO Allocation litigation, the largest co-ordinated securities litigation in US history. In both New York and California, Grauer is recognized for his representation of life sciences and healthcare companies, in particular regarding securities litigation, fraud litigation, government and regulatory investigations and internal corporate investigations. In 2016, Grauer was a mediator in confidential matters involving corporate Special Committee investigations.

== Education and early career ==
Grauer attended Cornell University and graduated in 1971 with honors in government, magna cum laude, and was awarded a degree with distinction. In 1974, he earned his J.D. from Cornell Law School, where he was the articles editor of the Law Review and was elected to the Order of the Coif.

In 1980, Grauer was appointed by the Attorney General of the United States as an assistant United States attorney handling Special Fraud Prosecutions in the U.S. District Court, Southern District of California. As an assistant United States attorney, he was given special achievement awards by the US Attorney General, the United States Postal Inspection Service, the Federal Bureau of Investigation and the United States Secret Service.

== Bar Association activities ==
Grauer was a member of the American Bar Association (ABA) House of Delegates for the 2008-2010 term and a lawyer representative, 9th Circuit Judicial Conference for the 2007-2010 term.

From 2005 to 2013, he was co-chair of the IPO Litigation Subcommittee of the ABA section of Litigation.

He has written extensively in the area of securities litigation (see Bibliography section).
