= Index fund =

Type of mutual fund or exchange-traded fund

An index fund is a mutual fund or exchange-traded fund (ETF) that has the goal of replicating, before fees and expenses, the performance of a stock market index or bond market index by holding the same securities as the index in the same proportions or, in the case of synthetic ETFs, by holding derivatives that produce the same return as the index. Index funds use passive management; they merely mirror an index and do not use stock picking. Many notable investors have recommended investing in index funds due to their diversification, low fees, simplicity for asset allocation, and historical outperformance over funds that use active management, partially explained by the efficient market hypothesis. Index funds are used by both individual investors and institutional investors such as pension funds. Because index funds seek to replicate rather than outperform a benchmark, their objective is generally to minimize tracking error and investment costs rather than generate excess returns through security selection.

Also available are modified index funds; they replicate the performance of the index with modifications such as the use of covered call strategies, equal weighting, performance buffers, leverage, or they exclude certain sectors, all with the goal of changing the risk/return and yield.

In the U.S., there was $22 trillion invested in index funds as of May 2026.

== History ==
The first theoretical model for an index fund was suggested in 1960 by Edward Renshaw and Paul Feldstein, both students at the University of Chicago. While their idea for an "Unmanaged Investment Company" garnered little support, it did start off a sequence of events in the 1960s.

The Qualidex Fund was started in 1970 and was the first open-end index mutual fund available to retail investors. It tracked the Dow Jones Industrial Average of 30 stocks. The problem with the Dow index is that it is price weighted, not market-cap weighted, so requires frequent costly rebalancing. Another early index fund was the Samsonite pension fund, which began to track the New York Stock Exchange in the early 1970s. It was an equally weighted fund. Again, because it was not market-cap weighted, this proved impractical.

In 1973, Burton Malkiel wrote A Random Walk Down Wall Street, which presented academic findings for the lay public. It was becoming well known in the popular financial press that most mutual funds were not beating the market indices. Malkiel wrote:

What we need is a no-load, minimum management-fee mutual fund that simply buys the hundreds of stocks making up the broad stock-market averages and does no trading from security to security in an attempt to catch the winners. Whenever below-average performance on the part of any mutual fund is noticed, fund spokesmen are quick to point out "You can't buy the averages." It's time the public could. ...there is no greater service [the New York Stock Exchange] could provide than to sponsor such a fund and run it on a nonprofit basis.... Such a fund is much needed, and if the New York Stock Exchange (which, incidentally has considered such a fund) is unwilling to do it, I hope some other institution will.

John Bogle graduated from Princeton University in 1951, where his senior thesis was titled The Economic Role of the Investment Company. Bogle wrote that his inspiration for starting an index fund came from three sources, all of which confirmed his 1951 research: Paul Samuelson's 1974 paper, "Challenge to Judgment"; Charles D. Ellis' 1975 study, "The Loser's Game"; and Al Ehrbar's 1975 Fortune magazine article on indexing. Bogle founded The Vanguard Group in 1974; as of 2009 it was the largest mutual fund company in the United States.

Bogle started the First Index Investment Trust on December 31, 1975. It tracks the Standard and Poor's 500 Index, and was later renamed the Vanguard 500 Index Fund. At launch, it was heavily derided by competitors as being "un-American" and was nicknamed "Bogle's folly". Fidelity Investments Chairman Edward Johnson III was quoted as saying that he "[couldn't] believe that the great mass of investors are going to be satisfied with receiving just average returns". It started with comparatively meager assets of $11 million but by November 1999 had $100 billion under management. Bogle predicted in January 1992 it would surpass the Magellan Fund before 2001, which it did in 2000.

John McQuown and David G. Booth of Wells Fargo, and Rex Sinquefield of the American National Bank in Chicago, established the first two Standard and Poor's Composite Index Funds in 1973. Both of these funds were established for institutional clients; individual investors were excluded. Wells Fargo started with $5 million from their own pension fund, while Illinois Bell put in $5 million of their pension funds at American National Bank. In 1971, Jeremy Grantham and Dean LeBaron at Batterymarch Financial Management "described the idea at a Harvard Business School seminar in 1971, but found no takers until 1973. Two years later, in December 1974, the firm finally attracted its first index client." AT&T, Ford and Exxon began to use index funds to manage their pension schemes.

In 1981, Booth and Sinquefield started Dimensional Fund Advisors (DFA), and McQuown joined its board of directors. DFA further developed indexed-based investment strategies. Vanguard started its first bond index fund in 1986.

Frederick L. A. Grauer at Wells Fargo harnessed McQuown and Booth's indexing theories, which led to Wells Fargo's pension funds managing over $69 billion in 1989 and over $565 billion in 1998. In 1996, Wells Fargo sold its indexing operation to Barclays, which it operated under the name Barclays Global Investors (BGI). BlackRock acquired BGI in 2009; the acquisition included BGI's index fund management (both its institutional funds and its iShares ETF business) and its active management.

== Advantages ==
=== Low costs ===
Because the composition of a target index is a known quantity, relative to actively managed funds, it costs less to run an index fund.

=== Simplicity ===
The investment objectives of index funds are easy to understand. Once an investor knows the target index of an index fund, what securities the index fund will hold can be determined directly. Managing one's index fund holdings may be low-effort as periodically rebalancing the portfolio.

=== Low turnover ===
Turnover refers to the selling and buying of securities by the fund manager. Selling securities in some jurisdictions may result in capital gains taxes, which are sometimes passed on to fund investors. Even in the absence of taxes, turnover has both explicit and implicit costs, which directly reduce returns on a dollar-for-dollar basis. Because index funds are passive investments, the turnover tends to be lower than actively managed funds.

=== No style drift ===
Style drift occurs when actively managed mutual funds go outside of their described style (i.e., mid-cap value, large cap income, etc.) to increase returns. Such drift hurts portfolios that are built with diversification as a high priority. Drifting into other styles could reduce the overall portfolio's diversity and subsequently increase risk. With an index fund, this drift is not possible and accurate diversification of a portfolio is increased.

== Disadvantages ==
=== Losses to arbitrageurs upon index rebalancing ===
Index funds must periodically "rebalance" or adjust their portfolios to match the new prices and market capitalization of the underlying securities in the index that they track. This allows algorithmic trading to take advantage of index arbitrage by anticipating and trading ahead of the market impact caused by mutual fund rebalancing, making a profit on foreknowledge of the large institutional block orders.

This results in profits transferred from investors to algorithmic traders.

In effect, an index, and consequently, all funds tracking an index are announcing ahead of time the trades that they are planning to make, allowing value to be siphoned by arbitrageurs, in a legal practice known as "index front running".

Losses to arbitrageurs appear as part of the tracking error.

=== Forced buying/selling upon index changes ===
Due to supply and demand, a company being added to an index can have a demand shock, and a company being deleted can have a supply shock, and this will change the value of such company. This does not show up in tracking error since the index is also affected. A fund may experience less impact by tracking a less popular index.

=== Tracking error ===
Since index funds aim to match market returns, both under- and over-performance compared to the market is considered a tracking error. For example, an inefficient index fund may generate a positive tracking error in a falling market by holding too much cash, which holds its value compared to the market.

The amount of tracking error depends on trading costs, which vary based on the liquidity in a market. Popular index funds in highly liquid markets (such as S&P 500 index funds) can match index performance within 0.01%, while index funds in emerging markets can have substantial tracking error. While index funds are considered a form of passive management, the internal plumbing of index funds can be complex, with a team of managers executing trades on behalf of the fund.

Some index funds utilize large block trading or patient/flexible trading strategies that aim to minimize market impact and adverse selection costs.

=== Concentration of assets among top asset managers ===
Benjamin Braun suggests that, since American stock ownership is concentrated on few big asset managers which are very diversified and do not have a direct interest in the performance of the companies, this emerging "asset manager capitalism" is distinct from the earlier shareholder primacy. The asset managers usually vote with company managers.

As funds invest in most companies in the sector, they benefit from monopolistic prices. In an extreme case, there could be economy-wide monopolies where asset managers have "bought the economy". In a regime of common ownership, while asset ownership is diversified, it is a small part of the population who invest in funds and a top 1% of the wealth distribution owning 50% of corporate equity and mutual funds. Wage stagnation would be an expected externality.

Asset managers have an incentive to increase the assets value and influence monetary policy.

== See also ==
- Enhanced indexing
- Exchange-traded fund
- Passive management
- Stock market index
