= Frederick L. A. Grauer =

Frederick L. A. Grauer was chairman and chief executive officer of Barclays Global Investors and its predecessors from 1983 to 1998 and a member of the management committee of Barclays Group. Grauer became a general partner of Angel Investors, L.P., a venture capital fund, in 1999, He also served as Senior Advisor to Barclays Global Investors and its acquiror, BlackRock, until 2015. A pioneer in index funds referred to as the "king of indexing" and the "godfather of quant management," Grauer was recognized by Global Custodian as one of the 100 most important contributors to modern finance in the 20th century and has been featured on the cover of Fortune.

Grauer became a general partner of Angel Investors, L.P. (predecessor to SV Angel) in 1999, where Fred, Ron Conway, Bob Boseman, and Casey McGlynn led investments in over 250 companies, including Google, PayPal, and Ask Jeeves. Their first fund, Angel Investors I, raised in 1999, generated a 7 times return, and their second, raised during 2000, saw a 1.5 times return.

Grauer is currently senior advisor to and a member of the boards of directors of Course Hero, a student question-and-answer platform that helps students learn faster and remember longer; Credit Sesame, a personal credit management platform for individuals seeking to optimize their use of credit, and a trustee of the Mountain View Funds of American Century Investments and chairman of its governance committee.

Grauer is also a member of the board of advisors to the Stanford Institute of Economic Policy Research.

In his not-for-profit activities, Grauer is chairman emeritus and charter trustee emeritus of the board of trustees of the Woodrow Wilson National Fellowship Foundation, and was a member of the boards of trustees of Commonfund, the Monterey Institute for International Studies, and Menlo School.

Previously, Grauer was with the capital markets group of Merrill Lynch and held several senior executive roles at Wells Fargo, including executive vice president and head of its funding group and CEO of Wells Fargo Investment Advisors. He was also a professor of finance at the MIT Sloan School of Management and Columbia University. Grauer received a Ph.D. in business from Stanford University, an M.A. in economics from University of Chicago and a B.A. with honours in economics from the University of British Columbia.
