= Mrs. Fun =

American acid jazz/free jazz duo

- Origin: Waukesha, Wisconsin, U.S.
- Genres: Jazz
- Years active: 1987–present
- Labels: Daemon, Funtime Records
- Members: Connie Grauer; Kim Zick
- Website: www.mrsfun.com

Mrs. Fun is an acid jazz/free jazz duo composed of keyboard player Connie Grauer and drummer Kim Zick. Grauer and Zick are from Waukesha, Wisconsin, but recorded Mrs. Fun's first album in Nashville, where they met the Indigo Girls. They then returned to Wisconsin, moving to Milwaukee. Their most recent album, Funsville, and their 1999 "best of" album appear on Daemon Records, while their previous records were released on their own FunTime Records.

== Discography ==
- Lulu's Walk (1987)
- They Are Not A Trio (1991)
- No Ennui (1995)
- Groove (1998)
- ChristMrs. Fun (1999)
- The Best Of Mrs. Fun (1999)
- Funsville (2000)
- Truth (2018)
