= Passive management =

Market-weighted investing strategy

Passive management (also called passive investing) is an investing strategy that tracks a market-weighted index or portfolio. Passive management is most common on the equity market, where index funds track a stock market index, but it is becoming more common in other investment types, including bonds, commodities and hedge funds. There has been a substantial increase in passive investing over the last twenty years.

The most popular method is to mimic the performance of an externally specified index by buying an index fund. By tracking an index, an investment portfolio typically gets good diversification, low turnover (good for keeping down internal transaction costs), and low management fees. With low fees, an investor in such a fund would have higher returns than a similar fund with similar investments but higher management fees and/or turnover/transaction costs.

The bulk of money in passive index funds are invested with the three passive asset managers: BlackRock, Vanguard and State Street. A major shift from assets to passive investments has taken place since 2008.

Passively managed funds consistently outperform actively managed funds. More than three-quarters of active mutual fund managers are falling behind the S&P 500 and the Dow Jones Industrial Average. The S&P Indices versus Active (SPIVA) scorecard, which tracks the performance of actively managed funds against their respective category benchmarks, showed that 79% of fund managers underperformed the S&P in 2021. It reflects an 86% jump over the past 10 years. In general, actively managed funds have failed to survive and beat their benchmarks, especially over longer time horizons; only 25% of all active funds topped the average of their passive rivals over the 10-year period ended June 2021. Investors, academicians, and authors such as Warren Buffett, John C. Bogle, Jack Brennan, Paul Samuelson, Burton Malkiel, David Swensen, Benjamin Graham, Gene Fama, William J. Bernstein, and Andrew Tobias have long been strong proponents of passive investing.

== History ==
The first US market indexes date to the 1800s. The Dow Jones Transportation Average was established in 1884 with eleven stocks, mostly railroads. The Dow Jones Industrial Average was created in 1896 with 12 stocks in industrial manufacturing, energy and related industries. Both are still in use with modifications, but the Industrial Average, commonly called "The Dow" or "Dow Jones", is more prominent and came to be regarded as an important measure for the American economy as a whole. Other influential US indexes include the S&P 500 (1957), a curated list of 500 stocks selected by committee, and the Russell 1000 Index (1984), which tracks the largest 1,000 stocks by market capitalization. The FTSE 100 (1984) represents the largest publicly traded in the UK, while the MSCI World index (1969) tracks stock markets of the entire developed world.

Unit investment trusts (UITs) are a type of U.S. investment vehicle that prohibits or severely restricts changes to the assets held in the trust. One such UIT is the Voya Corporate Leaders Trust (LEXCX), which as of 2019 was the oldest passively managed investment fund still in existence in the United States according to John Rekenthaler of Morningstar, Inc. Founded in 1935 as the Lexington Corporate Leaders Trust, LEXCX initially held 30 stocks, closely modeled on the Dow Industrials. LEXCX prohibited the purchase of new assets apart from those related directly to the original 30 (as with spin-offs or Mergers and acquisitions) and prohibited the sale of assets except when a stock eliminated dividends or was at risk of de-listing from the stock exchange. Unlike later index funds that are usually cap weighted, with greater proportional holdings in larger companies, LEXCX is share weighted: "holding the same number of shares in each company regardless of price." An evaluation by U.S. News & World Report found the fund was passively managed: "for all intents and purposes, this fund's portfolio is on autopilot."

The theory underlying passive management, the efficient-market hypothesis, was developed at the Chicago Graduate School of Business in the 1960s.

During this same period, researchers first began to discuss the concept of an "unmanaged investment company". In 1969, Arthur Lipper III became the first to try to turn theory into practice by petitioning the Securities and Exchange Commission to create a fund tracking the 30 stocks Dow Industrial Average. According to Lipper, the SEC did not respond. The first index funds were launched in the early 1970s, by American National Bank in Chicago, Batterymarch, and Wells Fargo; they were available only to large pension plans. The first index fund for individual investors was launched in 1976. The Vanguard First Index Investment Fund (now the Vanguard 500 Index Fund) was the brainchild of John (Jack) Bogle.

== Investment in passive strategies ==
Research conducted by the World Pensions Council (WPC) suggests that 15% to 20% of overall assets held by large pension funds and national social security funds are invested in various forms of passive funds- as opposed to the more traditional actively managed mandates which still constitute the largest share of institutional investments. The proportion invested in passive funds varies widely across jurisdictions and fund type.

The relative appeal of passive funds such as ETFs and other index-replicating investment vehicles has grown rapidly for various reasons ranging from disappointment with underperforming actively managed mandates to the broader tendency towards cost reduction across public services and social benefits that followed the 2008-2012 Great Recession. Public-sector pensions and national reserve funds have been among the early adopters of passive management strategies.

At the Federal Reserve Bank of St. Louis, YiLi Chien, Senior Economist wrote about return-chasing behavior. The average equity mutual fund investor tends to buy mutual funds with high past returns and sell otherwise. Buying mutual funds with high returns is called a "return-chasing behavior". Equity mutual fund flows have a positive correlation with past performance, with a return-flow correlation coefficient of 0.49. Stock market returns are almost unpredictable in the short term. Stock market returns tend to go back to the long-term average. The tendency to buy mutual funds with high returns and sell those with low returns can reduce profit.

Unsophisticated short-term investors sell passive ETFs during extreme market times. Passive funds affect the price of stocks.

== Rationale for passive investing ==
The concept of passive management is counterintuitive to many investors. The rationale behind indexing stems from the following concepts of financial economics:

1. In the long term, the average investor will have an average before-costs performance equal to the market average. Therefore, the average investor will benefit more from reducing investment costs than from trying to beat the average, and passive investments generally charge lower fees than actively-managed investments. This argument is commonly known as William Sharpe's zero-sum game theory.
2. The efficient-market hypothesis postulates that equilibrium market prices fully reflect all available information, or to the extent there is some information not reflected, there is nothing that can be done to exploit that fact. It is widely interpreted as suggesting that it is impossible to systematically "beat the market" through active management, although this is not a correct interpretation of the hypothesis in its weak form. Stronger forms of the hypothesis are controversial, and there is some debatable evidence against it in its weak form too. For further information see behavioural finance.
3. The principal–agent problem: an investor (the principal) who allocates money to a portfolio manager (the agent) must properly give incentives to the manager to run the portfolio in accordance with the investor's risk/return appetite, and must monitor the manager's performance.

Advocates for passive management argue that performance results provide support for Sharpe's zero-sum game theory. There are two prominent reports that compare the performance of index funds with the performance of actively-managed funds, the SPIVA (S&P Indexes Versus Active Funds) report and the Morningstar Active-Passive Barometer.

== Concerns about passive investing ==
Criticism has been leveled at passive investment by investors like Howard Marks, Carl Icahn, Michael Burry and Jeffrey Gundlach who argue that asset bubbles can be considered a byproduct of the increasing popularity of passive investing. John C. Bogle of The Vanguard Group, while a staunch advocate for passive investing overall, also argued in 2018 that the growth in passive management firms would soon result in a concentration of over half of American stock ownership, and associated proxy voting power, among three large firms (Vanguard, State Street Global Advisors and BlackRock). Bogle stated: "I do not believe such a concentration would serve the national interest".

In 2017, Robert Shiller, a Nobel Prize winning economist at Yale University, stated passive index funds are a "chaotic system" and "kind of pseudoscience" due to what he described as an over-reliance on computer models and a neglect of the businesses whose stocks make up index funds.

According to researchers with the Federal Reserve who published their findings in 2020, the growing popularity of passive investing has increased some risks for investors and the economy generally, but reduced other risks. "Some passive strategies amplify market volatility, and the shift [towards passive investing] has increased industry concentration, but it has diminished some liquidity and redemption risks."

Passive investing may contribute to shareholder apathy, whereby investors are less engaged in the corporate governance process.

Benjamin Braun suggests that, since American stock ownership is concentrated on few big asset managers which are very diversified and do not have a direct interest in the performance of the companies, this emerging "asset manager capitalism" is distinct from the earlier shareholder primacy. The asset managers usually vote with company managers. Also, as funds invest in most companies in the sector, they would benefit from monopolistic prices. In an extreme case, there could be economy-wide monopolies where asset managers have "bought the economy". In a regime of common ownership, while asset ownership is diversified, it is a small part of the population who invest in funds and a top 1% of the wealth distribution owning 50% of corporate equity and mutual funds. Wage stagnation would be an expected externality. Asset managers have an incentive to increase the assets value and influence monetary policy.

In response, defenders of passive investing argue that some claims against the strategy are incorrect, and that other claims are partially accurate but overstated.

== Implementation ==
The first step to implementing an index-based passive investment strategy is choosing a rules-based, transparent, and investable index consistent with the investment strategy's desired market exposure. Investment strategies are defined by their objectives and constraints, which are stated in their Investment Policy Statements. For equity passive investment strategies, the desired market exposures could vary by equity market segment (broad market vs. industry sectors, domestic vs. international), by style (value, growth, blend/core), or by other factors (size, high or low momentum, low volatility, quality).

Index rules could include the frequency at which index constituents are re-balanced, and criteria for including such constituents. These rules should be objective, consistent and predictable. Index transparency means that index constituents and rules are clearly disclosed, which ensures that investors can replicate the index. Index investability means that the index performance can be reasonably replicated by investing in the market. In the simplest case, investability means that all constituents of an index can be purchased on a public exchange.

Once an index has been chosen, an index fund can be implemented through various methods, financial instruments, and combinations thereof.

=== Implementation vehicles ===
Passive management can be achieved through holding the following instruments or a combination of the following instruments.

Index funds are mutual funds that try to replicate the returns of an index by purchasing securities in the same proportion as in the stock market index. Some funds replicate index returns through sampling (e.g., buying stocks of each kind and sector in the index but not necessarily some of each individual stock), and there are sophisticated versions of sampling (e.g., those that seek to buy those particular shares that have the best chance of good performance). Investment funds that employ passive investment strategies to track the performance of a stock market index are known as index funds.

Exchange-traded funds are open-ended, pooled, registered funds that are traded on public exchanges. A fund manager manages the underlying portfolio of the ETF much like an index fund, and tracks a particular index or particular indices. "Authorized participants" act as market makers for the ETF and deliver securities with the same allocation of the underlying fund to the fund manager in exchange for ETF units and vice versa. ETFs usually offer investors easy trading, low management fees, tax efficiency, and the ability to leverage using borrowed margin.

Index futures contracts are futures contracts on the price of particular indices. Stock market index futures offer investors easy trading, ability to leverage through notional exposure, and no management fees. However, futures contracts expire, so they must be rolled over periodically for a cost. As well, only relatively popular stock market indices have futures contracts, so portfolio managers might not get exactly the exposure they want using available futures contracts. The use of futures contracts is also highly regulated, given the amount leverage they allow investors. Portfolio managers sometimes uses stock market index futures contracts as short-term investment vehicles to quickly adjust index exposure, while replacing those exposures with cash exposures over longer periods.

Options on Index Futures Contracts are options on futures contracts of particular indices. Options offer investors asymmetric payoffs that could limit their risk of loss (or gain, depending on the option) to just the premiums they paid for the option. They also offer investors the ability to leverage their exposure to stock market indices since option premiums are lower than the amount of index exposure afforded by the options.

Stock Market Index Swaps are swap contracts typically negotiated between two parties to swap for a stock market index return in exchange for another source of return, typically a fixed income or money market return. Swap contracts exposure investors to counterparty credit risk, low liquidity risk, interest rate risk, and tax policy risk. However, swap contracts can be negotiated for whatever index the parties agree to use as underlying index, and for however long the parties agree to set the contract, so investors could potentially negotiate swaps more compatible with their investment needs than funds, ETFs, and futures contracts.

=== Implementation methods ===
Full replication in index investing means that the manager holds all securities represented by the index in weights that closely match the index weights. Full replication is easy to comprehend and explain to investors and mechanically tracks the index performance. However, full replication requires that all the index components have sufficient investment capacity and liquidity and that the assets under investment management is large enough to make investments in all components of the index. For very broad or less liquid indices, fund managers may instead use sampling techniques to reduce trading costs while maintaining a close approximation of index performance.

Stratified sampling in index investing means that managers hold sub-sets of securities sampled from distinct su-groups, or strata, of stocks in the index. The various strata imposed on the index should be mutually exclusive, exhaustive (sum to make up the whole index), and reflective of the characteristics and performance of the entire index. Common stratification techniques include industrial sector membership (such as sector membership defined by Global Industry Classification Standard (GICS)), equity style characteristics, and country affiliation. Sampling within each strata could be based on minimum market-cap criteria, or other criteria that mimics the weighting scheme of the index.

Optimization sampling in index investing means that managers hold a sub-set of securities generated from an optimization process that minimizes the index tracking error of a portfolio subject to constraints. These sub-sets of securities do not have to adhere to common stock sub-groups. Common constraints include the number of securities, market-cap limits, stock liquidity, and stock lot size.

Globally diversified portfolios of index funds are used by investment advisors who invest passively for their clients based on the principle that underperforming markets will be balanced by other markets that outperform. A Loring Ward report in Advisor Perspectives showed how international diversification worked over the 10-year period from 2000–2010, with the Morgan Stanley Capital Index for emerging markets generating ten-year returns of 154% balancing the S&P 500 index, which declined 9.1% over the same period – a historically rare event. The report noted that passive portfolios diversified in international asset classes generate more stable returns, particularly if rebalanced regularly.

State Street Global Advisors has long engaged companies on issues of corporate governance. Passive managers can vote against a board of directors using a large number of shares. Being forced to own stock on certain companies by the funds' charters, State Street pressures about principles of diversity, including gender diversity.

The Bank of America estimated in 2017 that 37 percent of the value of U.S. funds (not including privately held assets) were in passive investments such as index funds and index ETFs. The same year, BlackRock estimated that 17.5 percent of the global stock market was managed passively; in contrast, 25.6 percent was managed by active funds or institutional accounts, and 57 percent was privately held and presumably does not track an index. Similarly, Vanguard stated in 2018 that index funds own "15% of the value of all global equities".

== See also ==
- Investment management
- Active management
- Exchange-traded fund
- Buy and hold
- Index fund
- Enhanced indexing
- Passive investor – Non decision-making investor
- Relative return
- Value investing
- Investment style
- Financial risk management § Investment management
