= Active management =

Investment approach where managers actively select and adjust portfolio holdings

Active management (also called active investing) is an approach to investing. In an actively managed portfolio of investments, the investor selects the investments that make up the portfolio. Active management is often compared to passive management or index investing.

Passively managed funds consistently outperform actively managed funds.

== Approach ==
Active investors aim to generate additional returns by buying and selling investments advantageously. They look for investments where the market price differs from the underlying value and will buy investments when the market price is too low and sell investments when the market price is too high.

Active investors use various techniques to identify mispriced investments. Two common techniques are:

- Fundamental analysis. This approach analyzes the characteristics of individual investments to evaluate their risk and potential return.
- Quantitative analysis. This approach establishes a systematic process for buying and selling investments using data about individual investments.

Active management may be used in all aspects of investing. It can be used for:

- Security selection. Choosing individual stocks, bonds, or other investments.
- Asset allocation. Determining the allocation of investment among asset classes, such as stocks, bonds, and cash.
- Sustainable investing. Analyzing the impact of environmental, social, and governance (ESG) factors on investments.

Active investors have many goals. Many active investors are seeking a higher return. Other goals of active management can be managing risk, minimizing taxes, increasing dividend or interest income, or achieving non-financial goals, such as advancing social or environmental causes.

== Theory ==
Active investors seek to profit from market inefficiencies by purchasing investments that are undervalued or by selling securities that are overvalued.

Therefore, active investors do not agree with the strong and semi-strong forms of the efficient-market hypothesis (EMH). In the stronger forms of the EMH, all public information has been incorporated into stock prices, which makes it impossible to outperform.

Active management is consistent with the weak form of the EMH, which argues that prices reflect all information related to price changes in the past. Under the weak form the EMH, fundamental analysis can be profitable, though technical analysis can be profitable.

There are two well-known theories that the balance between active management and passive management:

- Grossman-Stiglitz (1980). In the Grossman-Stiglitz equilibrium, active investors benefit from researching potential investments by earning a higher return; however, these higher returns only offset the costs of performing the research. Grossman-Stiglitz explains why both active and passive investing would exist in equilibrium.
- Sharpe (1991). Sharpe's proposition argues that, before costs, the average active manager must earn the market return; therefore, after costs, the average active manager will earn less than the market. As a result, according to Sharpe, active investing is a zero sum game before costs and a negative sum game after costs.

With regard to empirical support for both theories, a 2021 paper finds that "the research findings seem to accord more with a Grossman and Stiglitz equilibrium than Sharpe's proposition." The paper also notes that "the underlying logic [of Sharpe's proposition] is not as water-tight as it may seem."

In the same vein, Barras et al. (2021) find that the average active manager earns a positive gross alpha of 0.71% (which contradicts Sharpe’s equality), although this alpha falls to –0.4% after costs.

A further theoretical development is provided by Pedersen (2018) and other authors, who argues that Sharpe’s arithmetic only holds in a static setting where both the index composition and aggregate savings are constant. In practice, corporate actions and net fund flows alter both, so active management would not be a zero-sum game.

== Performance ==
According to economists, actively managed funds consistently underperform, and, as a result, they recommend investing in index funds. Many academic studies have concluded that actively managed US equity funds underperform after fees. Well known studies include Jensen (1968), Malkiel (1995), Elton, Gruber, and Blake (1996), and Fama and French (2010). A 2019 paper in a journal operated by the CFA Institute has challenged this academic consensus.

There are two reports that regularly evaluate the performance of actively managed funds. The first is the SPIVA report (Standard & Poors Index Versus Active), which compares actively managed funds to an index. The second is the Morningstar Active-Passive Barometer, which compares actively managed funds to passively managed funds. Both reports are published semi-annually and use a similar approach, namely:

- They group funds into categories based on investment type (e.g., emerging market stocks, municipal bonds).
- For various periods (ranging from 1 year to 20 years), they compare the performance of the funds in the category to the performance of a relevant index (in the SPIVA report) or of passively managed funds in that category (in the Morningstar Barometer).
- They calculate the percentage of funds in the category that outperform the passive alternative and the percent that underperform. (SPIVA reports the percent that underperform, while Morningstar reports the percent that outperform.)

These reports have often concluded that the performance of actively-managed funds is disappointing. For example, the SPIVA U.S. Mid-Year 2025 report finds that 54%of actively managed large-cap US equity funds lagged the S&P 500 in the first 6 months of 2025 Results vary by category, with some categories experiencing a higher percentage of outperformance.

SPIVA publishes two additional reports comparing the performance of actively managed funds to a passive benchmark: a risk-adjusted performance analysis and a performance "persistence" analysis. The persistence analysis calculates the percentage of actively managed funds that have outperformed a passive benchmark in consecutive periods.

The persistence report is controversial. One critic has called persistence "overrated" and a "red herring". A 2025 Morningstar analysis concludes that "one-year performance outperformance is a poor predictor of future outperformance."

== Advantages of active management ==
Active management provides investors with the potential to earn higher returns. Active investors can have expertise that enables them to select investments that do better than the market as a whole.

Active management is more flexible than passive management. This flexibility has multiple benefits for investors:

- Active investors can tailor the risk of their investments to match their risk tolerance. For example, more conservative investors may want to adjust their portfolios to emphasize blue-chip investments, or they may plan to adjust the risk of their investments as their personal circumstances change.
- Investors can adjust portfolio in light of risks from existing exposures. For example, employees of high-tech companies might wish to limit exposure to the stocks of high-tech companies in their investment portfolios.
- Similarly, active investors can emphasize income generation (from dividends or coupon payments) over capital appreciation.
- Active investors have the ability to time the sale of investments with capital gains for tax-planning purposes.
- In certain asset classes, such as private market investments, passive alternatives may not be available; therefore, active management is needed to access these asset classes.
- Active investment enables investors to align their portfolios with their mission-based goals. For example, investors may want to emphasize companies with a lower carbon footprint or that follow certain practices with regard to diversity, equity, and inclusion.

== Disadvantages of active management ==
The most obvious disadvantage of active management is that investment returns may be lower rather than higher.

In addition, active management is generally more expensive than passive management. The higher costs are a result of the resources needed to evaluate investments and determine whether they should be bought or sold.

Finally, active management is often less tax-efficient than passive management, because it may buy and sell investments more frequently and generate capital gains as a result. However, active managers can be tax-efficient.

== Use of active management ==
Active management is the most common investment approach. For example, at the end of 2020, $14.8 trillion of U.S. mutual fund assets were actively managed, while only $4.8 trillion were passively managed.

However, active management does not dominate in every category. For example, at the end of 2020, only $0.2 trillion of the $5.3 trillion in assets in 1940 Act exchange-traded funds were actively managed.

== Effects on markets ==
Active management plays an important role in maintaining market efficiency. Through the buying and selling of investments, active managers establish the market prices for securities. Therefore, an increase in the amount of active management will lead to greater market efficiency.

Market efficiency is beneficial because it encourages broad investor participation in the market, it makes it easier for investors to diversity risk, and it encourages capital formation.

Active management also plays an important role in capital formation, because actively-managed portfolios are the buyers of initial public offerings of securities.

== See also ==
- Financial risk management § Investment management
- Investment management
- Index fund
- Passive management
- Magellan Fund
- Active risk
- Investment style
