= Absolute return =

One measure of the return of an investment portfolio

The absolute return or simply return is a measure of the gain or loss on an investment portfolio expressed as a percentage of invested capital. The adjective "absolute" is used to stress the distinction with the relative return measures (often used by long-only stock funds) that are based on comparison to a benchmark.

The hedge fund business is defined by absolute returns. Unlike traditional asset managers, who try to track and outperform a benchmark (a reference index such as the Dow Jones and S&P 500), hedge fund managers employ different strategies in order to produce a positive return regardless of the direction and the fluctuations of capital markets. This is one reason why hedge funds are referred to as alternative investment vehicles (see hedge funds for more details).

Absolute return managers tend to be characterised by their use of short selling, leverage and high turnover in their portfolios.

== Benchmark ==
Although absolute return funds are sometimes considered not to have a benchmark, there is a common one: the funds should do better than short-dated government bonds (e.g. T-bills in the United States). For example, if such "cash" instruments yield 15%, and the fund returns 5% in that same time period, the fund would be under performing the benchmark. In the case where the cash rate is close to zero, such as the early 2010s decade, this makes little difference.

== Short selling ==
Suppose that a manager thinks the share price of company A will go down. Then he can borrow 1000 shares of company A from his prime broker and sell them for (say) 10 USD per share. The immediate gain for the manager is $1000\times 10 = 10,000$ USD. If (say) after a week the share price of company A drops to 9.5 then the manager buys 1000 shares, paying $1000\times 9.5 = 9,500$ USD, and gives the shares back to his prime broker. He thus ends up earning a return of $(10,000-9,500)/10,000 = 5\%$. If his prime broker asked a 2% interest rate for borrowing the shares then the net gain of the manager is $5\%-2\% = 3\%$.

== Leverage ==
Sometimes a strategy gives a positive return albeit a very small one. Therefore, a manager can use leverage to magnify his return. For example, a long-short manager can deposit 100M with his prime broker in order to buy 200M of shares and simultaneously sell another 200M of shares, which gives a leverage ratio of $(200M+200M)/100M = 4$. As another example, a manager can borrow money from a country at an interest rate of 2% and reinvest the amount in another country that pays 4%, thus earning the spread $4\%-2\%=2\%$ (this is called carry trade). If the manager has a leverage ratio of (say) 5 then his return is not 2% but $5\times 2\% = 10\%$.

However, leverage also amplifies losses: if a manager has a market loss of 3% in his portfolio and a leverage of 4 then his total losses are $4\times 3\% = 12\%$. Therefore, even small market losses can be disastrous when there is a huge leverage. According to the OECD, prior to the 2007 crisis, hedge funds in 2007 had an average leverage of 3 whilst investment banks had a leverage above 30. With a leverage of 30, a market loss of 3.3% wipes out the entire portfolio whilst a leverage of 3 gives a total loss of 10%.

== High turnover ==
Some absolute-return managers are very active with their portfolios, buying and selling shares more frequently than normal investors, because they focus on short-term investment opportunities lasting less than 90 days. Turnover is the rate at which managers rebalance their portfolios, and among other things it depends on the hedge fund's size: in 2008 hedge funds with less than 15M USD in AUM (assets under management) had a 46.9% turnover per month whilst funds with over 250M USD in AUM had only 9.8%.

== See also ==
- Alpha and beta
