= Halliburton Co. v. Erica P. John Fund, Inc. =

- Supreme Court of the United States

Argued March 5, 2014 Decided June 23, 2014
- Full case name: Halliburton Co., et al. v. Erica P. John Fund, Inc., fka Archdiocese of Milwaukee Supporting Fund, Inc.
- Docket no.: 13-317
- Citations: 573 U.S. 258 (more) 134 S. Ct. 2398; 189 L. Ed. 2d 339
- Argument: Oral argument
- Opinion announcement: Opinion announcement

Case history
- Prior: Erica P. John Fund, Inc. v. Halliburton Co., 131 S. Ct. 2179, 563 U.S., 180 L. Ed. 2d 24 (2011).

Holding
- Securities fraud defendants must be afforded an opportunity to rebut the presumption of reliance before class certification with evidence of a lack of price impact.

Court membership
- Chief Justice John Roberts Associate Justices Antonin Scalia · Anthony Kennedy; Clarence Thomas · Ruth Bader Ginsburg; Stephen Breyer · Samuel Alito; Sonia Sotomayor · Elena Kagan

Case opinions
- Majority: Roberts, joined by Kennedy, Ginsburg, Breyer, Sotomayor, Kagan
- Concurrence: Ginsburg, joined by Breyer, Sotomayor
- Concurrence: Thomas (in judgment), joined by Scalia, Alito

Laws applied
- Securities Exchange Act of 1934, Rule 10b-5

Halliburton Co. v. Erica P. John Fund, Inc., 573 U.S. 258 (2014), is a United States Supreme Court case regarding class action certification for a securities fraud claim. Under the fraud-on-the-market theory, the Court had to inquire as to if markets are economically efficient. The Court presumed they are.

== Background ==
Halliburton CEO Dick Cheney arranged a merger with competitor Dresser Industries, which had been directed for decades by Prescott Bush. Halliburton publicly promoted the merger as a "win-win", and plaintiffs, including the Archbishop of Milwaukee, bought equity in Halliburton off the stock market. What Halliburton did not reveal was that Dresser's asbestos liabilities nearly exceeded its purchase price. Cheney then resigned, sold off $40 million of his Halliburton stock, and joined the Bush campaign. When Halliburton publicly revealed its asbestos liabilities its stock dropped 72% The Archbishop sued, bringing a class action in the Dallas federal district court, alleging securities fraud.

SEC Rule 10b-5 securities fraud requires a private plaintiff to prove that her economic loss was caused by reliance on the defendant's material misrepresentation. Certification for a class action requires class members to have common questions of law or fact that predominate the controversy. Common reliance on public information is presumed if plaintiffs bought off a well developed market under the fraud on the market theory developed in Basic Inc. v. Levinson.

Halliburton argued that before the class could be certified the plaintiffs also needed to prove their loss was caused by Halliburton's falsehoods. The District Court agreed and denied class certification, meaning that the plaintiffs would each individually have to bring their claims. The denial was affirmed by the Fifth Circuit.

In his first argument before the Court since Bush v. Gore, David Boies represented plaintiffs. In Erica P. John Fund, Inc. v. Halliburton Co. the Supreme Court vacated and remanded. Finding the fraud on the market presumption only addresses members’ common reliance, the Court held that plaintiffs did not need to prove loss causation when seeking class certification.

On remand Halliburton argued that because its falsehoods had no effect on its stock price plaintiffs could not have commonly relied on the falsehoods. The district court found that argument could only be made later during trial, granted class certification, and the Fifth Circuit affirmed. Halliburton petitioned the Supreme Court for another writ of certiorari, this time arguing that the fraud on the market precedent should be overruled, and the petition was granted.

== Opinion of the Court ==
Chief Justice Roberts, joined by five other justices, finds no special reason to overrule Supreme Court precedent. Addressing Halliburton's contention that the Basic presumption is a “judicial construct” that differs from fraud in securities filings, Roberts notes that because this point was made by the dissenters in Basic, it has already been rejected. Furthermore, Roberts notes that stare decisis has special force because Congress is free to change the Basic presumption, and subsequently has chosen not to do so despite two major securities fraud reforms.

Roberts then turns to market capitalism’s fundamental economic theory. The efficient market hypothesis holds that the ideal market price fully reflects all available information. The Court in Basic Inc. v. Levinson (1988) had relied on the hypothesis to presume that any false information about a stock would be reflected in the stock’s market price and, therefore, be relied upon by investors that bought the stock off the market. A contentious core tenet of the Chicago school of economics the hypothesis has proven difficult to disprove and, in 2013 the Nobel Prize in Economics was jointly awarded to Eugene Fama, the hypothesis’s creator, and Robert J. Shiller, the hypothesis’s primary critic.

Halliburton argued that its misrepresentations did not impact its stock price because the efficient market hypothesis is empirically false and capital markets are not fundamentally efficient. Roberts rejects this contention, finding that information does, in fact, effect stock price. While Halliburton may not have traded in an ideal frictionless market, Roberts finds that “in making the presumption rebuttable, Basic recognized that market efficiency is a matter of degree and accordingly made it a matter of proof.”

Halliburton also argued that presuming reliance on market price is wrong because investors are actually indifferent to price. Value investing was offered as an example of traders who invest believing that the true value of a company is different from its market price. Roberts rejects this, finding, no, value investors are not indifferent to price and, in fact, their investment strategy presupposes the market price will eventually move towards a more accurate valuation.

Other than overruling Basic, Halliburton had alternatively asked that instead of asking plaintiffs to prove the stock traded in a well developed market, plaintiffs should be required to directly prove price impacts from the falsehoods. Roberts notes that the Basic presumption is actually a presumption of price impact and a presumption of reliance, and that the same reasons justify both presumptions.

Instead of burdening plaintiffs, Roberts decides that defendants should be able to rebut the reliance presumption with evidence of a lack of price impact before class certification. Noting that the same evidence may already be proffered to show market efficiency and the publicity of misrepresentations, Roberts sees nothing gained and much lost by forbidding direct price impact evidence. The case was then vacated and remanded to give Halliburton the opportunity to prove the absence of price impact.

== Concurrence and Concurrence in Judgment ==
Concurring Justice Ginsburg, joined by Justice Breyer and Justice Sotomayor, note that moving the price impact inquiry to the class certification stage may broaden the scope of discovery.

Concurred in judgment only, Justice Thomas was joined by Justice Scalia and Justice Alito. Deriding “Basic’s muddled logic and armchair economics,” Thomas believes he may overrule such precedent when it is “badly reasoned”.

The conservative justices then reject the efficient market hypothesis. They find that ‘“overwhelming empirical evidence” now suggests that even when markets do incorporate information, they often fail to do so accurately”. Deriding “the Court’s rather superficial analysis”, Thomas concludes that investment decisions are “made with indifference to price and thus without regard for price “integrity””.

Because false statements do not effect market prices and investors are indifferent to the price they pay anyway, Thomas sees the Basic presumption as doing no good and much harm. Noting that on merits only six defendants have successfully rebutted individual plaintiffs’ reliance on price integrity, Thomas fears that the Basic presumption in practice is “largely irrebuttable”. What's worse for Thomas, the huge damages resulting from securities fraud creates “substantial in terrorem settlement pressures” for large publicly traded companies to pay deceived shareholders. Concluding that reliance in security fraud is “inherently individualized”, Thomas would overrule Basic and require every deceived shareholder to sue separately.

== Subsequent developments ==
White-collar defense lawyers decried the ruling, while it was viewed as good for witness economists. Academics blamed the ruling on a status quo bias and complained that shareholders' rights were being entrenched.

U.S. Appeals Courts would not find the fraud-on-the-market presumption rebutted again until April 12, 2016.

== See also ==
- List of United States Supreme Court cases, volume 573
