= Franz Klein =

Franz Klein may refer to:

- Franz Klein (politician) (1854–1926), Austrian jurist and politician, Minister of Justice
- Franz Klein (sculptor) (1779–1840), Austrian sculptor
