= Random walk hypothesis =

Financial theory

The random walk hypothesis is a financial theory which states that the prices of financial assets, particularly those in the stock market, follow a random walk. According to this hypothesis, price variations occur in an essentially random manner, which implies that they cannot be systematically predicted or consistently exploited to achieve returns above those of the overall market.

== History ==
The concept can be traced to French broker Jules Regnault who published a book in 1863, and then to French mathematician Louis Bachelier whose Ph.D. dissertation titled "The Theory of Speculation" (1900) included some remarkable insights and commentary. The same ideas were later developed by MIT Sloan School of Management professor Paul Cootner in his 1964 book The Random Character of Stock Market Prices. The term was popularized by the 1973 book A Random Walk Down Wall Street by Burton Malkiel, a professor of economics at Princeton University, and was used earlier in Eugene Fama's 1965 article "Random Walks In Stock Market Prices", which was a less technical version of his Ph.D. thesis. The theory that stock prices move randomly was earlier proposed by Maurice Kendall in his 1953 paper, The Analysis of Economic Time Series, Part 1: Prices. In 1993 in the Journal of Econometrics, K. Victor Chow and Karen C. Denning published a statistical tool (known as the Chow–Denning test) for checking whether a market follows the random walk hypothesis.

== Testing the hypothesis ==
Random walk hypothesis test by increasing or decreasing the value of a fictitious stock based on the odd/even value of the decimals of pi. The chart resembles a stock chart.

Whether financial data can be considered a random walk is a venerable and challenging question. One of two possible results are obtained, the data does fall under random walk or the data does not. To investigate whether observed data follows a random walk, some methods or approaches have been proposed, for example, the variance ratio (VR) tests, the Hurst exponent and surrogate data testing.

Burton G. Malkiel, an economics professor at Princeton University and author of A Random Walk Down Wall Street, performed a test where his students were given a hypothetical stock that was initially worth fifty dollars. The closing stock price for each day was determined by a coin flip. If the result was heads, the price would close a half point higher, but if the result was tails, it would close a half point lower. Thus, each time, the price had a fifty-fifty chance of closing higher or lower than the previous day. Cycles or trends were determined from the tests. Malkiel then took the results in chart and graph form to a chartist, a person who "seeks to predict future movements by seeking to interpret past patterns on the assumption that 'history tends to repeat itself'." The chartist told Malkiel that they needed to immediately buy the stock. Since the coin flips were random, the fictitious stock had no overall trend. Malkiel argued that this indicates that the market and stocks could be just as random as flipping a coin.

== Asset pricing with a random walk ==
Modelling asset prices with a random walk takes the form:

$S_{t+1}=S_{t}+\mu\Delta{t}S_{t}+\sigma\sqrt{\Delta{t}}S_{t}Y_{i}$

where

$\mu$ is a drift constant

$\sigma$ is the standard deviation of the returns

$\Delta{t}$ is the change in time

$Y_i$ is an i.i.d. random variable satisfying $Y_i\sim N(0,1)$.

== A non-random walk hypothesis ==
There are other economists, professors, and investors who believe that the market is predictable to some degree. These people believe that prices may move in trends and that the study of past prices can be used to forecast future price direction. There have been some economic studies that support this view, and a book has been written by two professors of economics that tries to prove the random walk hypothesis wrong.

A 1964 senior thesis at Harvard University by Victor Niederhoffer, who was later a professor and hedge fund manager, entitled "Non-Randomness in Stock Prices; A New Model of Price Movements," disagreed with the random walk hypothesis in finance; he argued that it followed patterns. His thesis advisor was Robert Dorfman. He followed that with his Ph.D. dissertation at the University of Chicago Booth School of Business in December 1969 entitled "World Events and Stock Prices: A Study of New York Times Headlines and Subsequent Movements in the Standard and Poor's Composite Index." In it, he concluded that during the 1960–68 study period, there was a consistent pattern of stock price movement on the Standard & Poor's Composite Index subsequent to "bad" world events: the day after such an event, the index fell, but on days two through five, the market rose, suggesting a tendency for investors to initially overreact to bad news and then recover.

Martin Weber, a researcher in behavioural finance, has performed many tests and studies on finding trends in the stock market. In one of his key studies, published in 1999, he observed the stock market for ten years. Throughout that period, he looked at the market prices for noticeable trends and found that stocks with high price increases in the first five years tended to become under-performers in the following five years. Weber and other believers in the non-random walk hypothesis cite this as a key contributor and contradictor to the random walk hypothesis.

Another test that Weber ran that contradicts the random walk hypothesis was finding stocks that have had an upward revision for earnings outperform other stocks in the following six months. With this knowledge, investors can have an edge in predicting what stocks to pull out of the market and which stocks — the stocks with the upward revision — to leave in. Weber’s studies detract from the random walk hypothesis, because according to Weber, there are trends and other tips to predicting the stock market.

Professors Andrew W. Lo and Archie Craig MacKinlay, professors of Finance at the MIT Sloan School of Management and the University of Pennsylvania, respectively, have also presented evidence that they believe shows the random walk hypothesis to be wrong. Their 1999 book A Non-Random Walk Down Wall Street, presents a number of tests and studies that reportedly support the view that there are trends in the stock market and that the stock market is somewhat predictable.

One element of their evidence is the simple volatility-based specification test, which has a null hypothesis that states:

$$X_t = \mu + X_{t-1} + \epsilon_t\,$$

where

$X_t$ is the log of the price of the asset at time $t$

$\mu$ is a drift constant

$\epsilon_t$ is a random disturbance term where $\mathbb{E}[\epsilon_t]=0$ and $\mathbb{E}[\epsilon_t \epsilon_\tau]=0$ for $\tau \neq t$ (this implies that $\tau$ and $t$ are independent since $\mathbb{E}[\epsilon_t \epsilon_\tau]=\mathbb{E}[\epsilon_t] \mathbb{E}[\epsilon_{\tau}]$).

To refute the hypothesis, they compare the variance of $(X_t-X_{t+\tau})$ for different $\tau$ and compare the results to what would be expected for uncorrelated $\epsilon_t$. Lo and MacKinlay authored a paper, the adaptive market hypothesis, which puts forth another way of looking at the predictability of price changes.

Peter Lynch, a mutual fund manager at Fidelity Investments between 1977 and 1990, argued in 1989 that the random walk hypothesis contradicts the efficient-market hypothesis (EMH). In Lynch's view, if prices are rational and reflect all available information as EMH proposes, then their fluctuations should not be "random"; conversely, if prices do follow a random walk, then they cannot be rational. According to modern portfolio theory, this is imprecise. 1970 Nobel laureate Paul Samuelson (1965) showed that in an informationally efficient market the (properly discounted) price follows a martingale, implying that price changes are unpredictable given available information; the "random" in "random walk hypothesis" means unforecastable rather than irrational.
