= Redress =

Redress is a setting right, as of injury, oppression, or wrong. Redress may refer to:

- Redress of grievances or right to petition
  - Redress of grievances in the United States
- Legal redress
- Redress (charitable organisation)
- Redress Control Number, an identification number issued to travelers who would otherwise be subjected to excessive scrutiny at U.S. security checkpoints
- REDress Project, a Canadian public art installation
- Collective redress, a legal concept
- Japanese American redress and court cases
- Japanese Canadian Redress, a 1988 agreement regarding the internment of Japanese Canadians during World War II

== See also ==
- set redress
