= Adaptive Investment Approach =

The concept of Adaptive Investment Approach (AIA), first proposed by Ma (2010, 2013, 2015), is the name given to the investment strategies that under which investors can constantly adjust their investments to reflect market conditions such as the volatility of investments, the return or the current condition of the market (Bull or Bear). The purpose of the approach is to achieve positive returns regardless of the timing in the investing environment. The AIA is a product of the theory of adaptive market hypothesis (AMH) proposed by Lo (2004, 2005, 2012). In contrast to efficient-market hypothesis (EMH), AMH regards markets as a constantly adaptive process from which the market is moving from inefficiency to efficiency, thus allowing developments in economies and behavioral finance factors to be accounted for in driving market returns.

The two deep bear markets in the first decade of the 21st century challenged the conventional wisdom such as Efficient Market Hypothesis or Modern Portfolio Theory (MPT). Many of the assumptions behind Efficient Market Theory and MPT, like the assumed direct positive relationship between risk and return, stable volatility, and correlation across time, were shown to fall short when attempting to explain behavior in the market. A use of the Efficient Market Theory is a strategy dubbed the Buy and Hold that makes no use of market timing to achieve desirable returns. The notion is that in the case that all fundamental information is utilized; an investor can gain no benefit from trying to time the market. The practice can be useful when the market is in an upswing, but it can lead to large losses occasionally that can destroy investors' wealth and confidence. The lack of confidence can lead to the investor failing to capitalize on the market rebound.

As an alternative, the adaptive market hypothesis is an attempt to combine the rational principles based on the Efficient Market Hypothesis with the irrational principles of the market because of human psychology. The Efficient Market Hypothesis suggests that market efficiency is not an absolute circumstance, but instead, it can be seen as a constantly adaptive process of moving from market inefficiency to efficiency. The understanding of this concept can help investors take advantage of arbitrage opportunities and time the market more effectively.

== Approach ==
Adaptive investment approach aims to deliver consistent returns by adapting to the ever-changing market conditions. There are many deviations of how to develop an adaptive approach but three methods are particularly interesting:

1. Adaptive Regime Approach. This methodology seeks to recognize the current regime in the market and then capitalize on the knowledge. Investors would seek to apply the approach by investing in riskier investments during a bull market and then flee to a combination of Treasuries and/or cash in a bear market. If properly implemented, the investor can expect upside participation while avoiding the loss of capital in major drawdowns.
2. Adaptive Return Approach. This strategy's purpose is to shift allocations to the investments most desirable returns. The aim is to detect underlying trends in the market and capitalize on them. The approach can be categorized as a momentum strategy or a methodology of following trends. The ongoing study of the impact of human psychology on the market has uncovered that investors have an inclination to react slowly to information when it first surfaces, but eventually over-react towards the closing of the trend.
3. Adaptive Risk Approach. This tactic seeks to utilize changes in volatility to optimize portfolio's allocation to reduce risk exposure. The purpose is to identify when shifts in market volatility occur, then using the information, make a calculated adjustment to a portfolio's allocation in an effort to reduce risk exposure. The current market condition has generated more risk for portfolios and implementing strategies to manage the risk is an important part of any investor's process. Using volatility to determine allocation and risk parity are some of the strategies that can be utilized to improve a portfolio's risk/return profile.

Ma (2015) shows that all the three approach can be integrated into a more robust system of investing. The Adaptive Investment Approach possesses the ability to assist individuals that are attempting to gain favorable returns while simultaneously focusing on capital preservation.
