= Yeazell =

Yeazell is a surname. Notable people with the surname include:

- Ruth Yeazell (born 1947), American literary critic
- Stephen C. Yeazell, American legal scholar
