= Securities class action =

Type of lawsuit

A securities class action (SCA), or securities fraud class action, is a lawsuit filed by investors who bought or sold a company's publicly traded securities within a specific period of time (known as a “class period”) and suffered economic injury as a result of violations of the securities laws.

In cases involving misleading statements or omissions, a class period generally starts when a company makes an untrue statement of material fact about the company or fails to disclose a material fact necessary to render other statements not misleading.

The class period generally ends when the truth is fully disclosed to the investing public. The statement or action that reveals the truth related to a specific alleged misstatement or omission is known as a "corrective disclosure". During the class period there is usually one final corrective disclosure and in some complex cases, several partial corrective disclosures that reveal partial truths related to the alleged misstatements or omissions.

"Cases are brought pursuant to Federal Rule of Civil Procedure 23 on behalf of a group of persons who purchased the securities of a particular company during a specified period of time (the class period)."

== The Private Securities Litigation Reform Act (PSLRA) (1995); securities class actions ==
The Private Securities Litigation Reform Act (PSLRA) of 1995 encouraged institutional investors to participate as lead plaintiffs in securities class actions "to shift the balance of power between shareholders and class action lawyers by allowing investors with the most substantial losses to take control over" the case. Approximately forty percent of securities fraud cases have a public pension fund or labor union fund lead plaintiff. Since the passage of the PSLRA, institutional investors rely on portfolio monitoring services offered by plaintiff class action law firms to identify "loss recovery opportunities."

In 2018, Institutional Shareholder Services recorded 136 approved settlements in North America and $6.1 billion in settlement funds for distribution. U.S. public corporations' exposure to securities class actions that allege violations of the federal securities laws under Section 10(b) and 20(a) of the Securities Exchange Act of 1934 amounts to "approximately one quarter of a percentage point of the aggregate market capitalization of U.S.-based corporations."

In securities class actions that allege violations of Section 11 of the Securities Act of 1933, "officers and directors are liable together with the corporation for material misrepresentations in the registration statement."

To have "standing" to sue under Section 11 of the 1933 Act in a class action, a plaintiff must be able to prove that he can "trace" his shares to the registration statement in question, as to which there is alleged a material misstatement or omission. In the absence of an ability to actually trace his shares, such as when securities issued at multiple times are held by the Depository Trust Company in a fungible bulk and physical tracing of particular shares may be impossible, the plaintiff may be barred from pursuing his claim for lack of standing.

The Supreme Court's unanimous decision in Cyan allowed state courts to "retain subject-matter jurisdiction over class actions alleging only 1933 Act claims. Defendants cannot move these actions to federal court." The ruling caused confusion in the securities class action bar because "Cyan permits a class action asserting Section 11 or 12(a)(2) claims under the 1933 Act to proceed in state court while a related Section 10(b) class action is proceeding under the Securities Exchange Act of 1934 in Federal Court." Cyan also contributed to rising costs in executive liability insurance for directors and officers of publicly traded companies due to soaring exposures.

U.S. corporate exposure to alleged violations of Rule 10b-5 of the Exchange Act amounted to $135.1 billion during the second quarter of 2019. U.S. Corporate exposure to alleged violations of Rule 10b-5 of the Exchange Act amounted to $68.4 billion in 3Q 2019. U.S. Corporate exposure to alleged violations of Rule 10b-5 of the Exchange Act amounted to $321.1 billion in full year 2019.

Global corporate exposure to issuers of common stock that trade on American exchanges amounted to $75.2 billion in 1Q 2020. U.S. Corporate exposure to alleged violations of Rule 10b-5 of the Exchange Act amounted to $63.5 billion in 1Q of 2020. Exposure to alleged violations of Rule 10b-5 for non-U.S. issuers amounted to $11.68 billion in 1Q 2020. Global corporate exposure to issuers of common stock that trade on American exchanges amounted to $53.1 billion in 2Q 2020. U.S. corporate exposure to alleged violations of Rule 10b-5 of the Exchange Act amounted to $45 billion in 2Q of 2020. Exposure to alleged violations of Rule 10b-5 for Non-U.S. issuers amounted to $8.1 billion in 2Q 2020. Global corporate exposure to issuers of common stock that trade on American exchanges amounted to $133.2 billion in 3Q 2020. U.S. Corporate exposure to alleged violations of Rule 10b-5 of the Exchange Act amounted to $101.8 billion in 3Q of 2020. Exposure to alleged violations of Rule 10b-5 for Non-U.S. issuers amounted to $31.4 billion in 3Q 2020.

A handful of law firms are specialized in this type of litigation. Class action securities litigation has been a lucrative field due to large settlements, the largest historic settlements having been Enron ($7.2 billion), WorldCom ($6.1 billion), Tyco International ($3.2 billion), and VEREIT ($1.1 billion).

Event study analysis is the court-accepted methodology for evaluating the degree of informational efficiency during an alleged Class Period. The ease to prove damages, and thus the ability to garner and drive large settlements, may be tempered by the Halliburton Supreme Court case which allows direct evidence to counter efficient market or Fraud-on-the-market theory. Because plaintiffs often rely on evidence of the existence of price impact using event studies, defendants may rely on similar statistical analysis prior to class certification to identify an absence of price impact. Evidence that proves that an absence of stock price impact exists may prevent class certification by rebutting Basic's presumption of reliance.

It was announced in 2014 that the European Union may "introduce an injunctive and compensatory collective redress mechanism to their national procedural rules by July 26, 2015," thereby replacing the pooling of private securities litigation cases with securities class action litigation.

== See also ==
- List of class-action lawsuits
