= Class action =

Type of lawsuit

A class action, (Note: The proper term used by specialists in complex litigation is class action, which replaced the historical term class suit after the merger of common law and equity courts. "Class action lawsuit" and "class action suit" are pleonasms used by laypersons unfamiliar with the critical distinction between the legal terms of art "action" and "suit" (which traditionally refer, respectively, to legal proceedings at common law and in equity).) also known as a class-action lawsuit, class suit, or representative action, is a type of lawsuit where a person or small group of people is authorized to sue on behalf of the interests of a larger group of similarly situated parties. The class action originated in the United States in the late 19th and early 20th centuries and is still predominantly an American phenomenon. Canada and several European countries with civil law systems allow consumer organizations to bring claims on behalf of consumers.

== Description ==
In a typical class action, a plaintiff sues a defendant or a number of defendants on behalf of a group, or class, of absent parties. This differs from a traditional lawsuit, in which the plaintiffs sue one or more defendants, and all of the parties are present in court. For example, a group in a class action lawsuit could be any person who ever bought a specific dangerous product; in a traditional lawsuit, the plaintiff is a single individual person or business that bought the dangerous product.

Although standards differ across states and countries, class actions are most common where the allegations involve at least 40 people whom the same defendant has injured in the same way. Instead of each individual person bringing their own lawsuits separately, the class action allows the claims of all class members—whether they know they have been damaged or not—to be resolved in a single proceeding through the efforts of the representative plaintiff(s) and appointed class counsel.

== History ==
=== England and the United Kingdom ===
The antecedent of the class action was what modern observers call "group litigation," which appears to have been quite common in medieval England from about 1200 onward. These lawsuits involved groups of people either suing or being sued in actions at common law. These groups were usually based on existing societal structures like villages, towns, parishes, and guilds. Unlike modern courts, the medieval English courts did not question the right of the actual plaintiffs to sue on behalf of a group or a few representatives to defend an entire group. Stephen C. Yeazell has theorized that the most likely reason is that the abysmally poor transportation, communications, and administrative apparatus of medieval England meant it was impossible for the English sovereign to manage the country in terms of individuals. It was much easier for the Crown to bluntly impose obligations upon entire groups, to be enforced through the sporadic use of force. Lawyers and judges did not question the right of a group to sue or be sued because to do so would bring into question the entire group-oriented society in which they operated.

From 1400 to 1700, group litigation gradually switched from being the norm in England to the exception. The development of the concept of the corporation led to the wealthy supporters of the corporate form becoming suspicious of all unincorporated legal entities, which in turn led to the modern concept of the unincorporated or voluntary association. The tumultuous history of the Wars of the Roses and then the Star Chamber resulted in periods during which the common law courts were frequently paralyzed, and out of the confusion the Court of Chancery emerged with exclusive jurisdiction over group litigation.

Chancery jurisprudence on group litigation became increasingly incoherent after 1700. As the basis of this, Yeazell has pointed to the trends towards fragmentation and individualism in English society during that period; the resulting societal pressures ultimately led to the Reform Act 1832. The underlying problem was the shift from representation based on the presumed or implied consent of a group to representation based on a common interest, such as holding shares of a corporation.

By 1850, Parliament had enacted several statutes on a case-by-case basis to deal with issues regularly faced by certain types of organizations, like joint-stock companies, and with the impetus for most types of group litigation removed, it went into a steep decline in English jurisprudence from which it never recovered. It was further weakened by the fact that equity pleading, in general, was falling into disfavor, which culminated in the Judicature Acts of 1874 and 1875. Group litigation was essentially dead in the United Kingdom after 1850.

=== United States ===
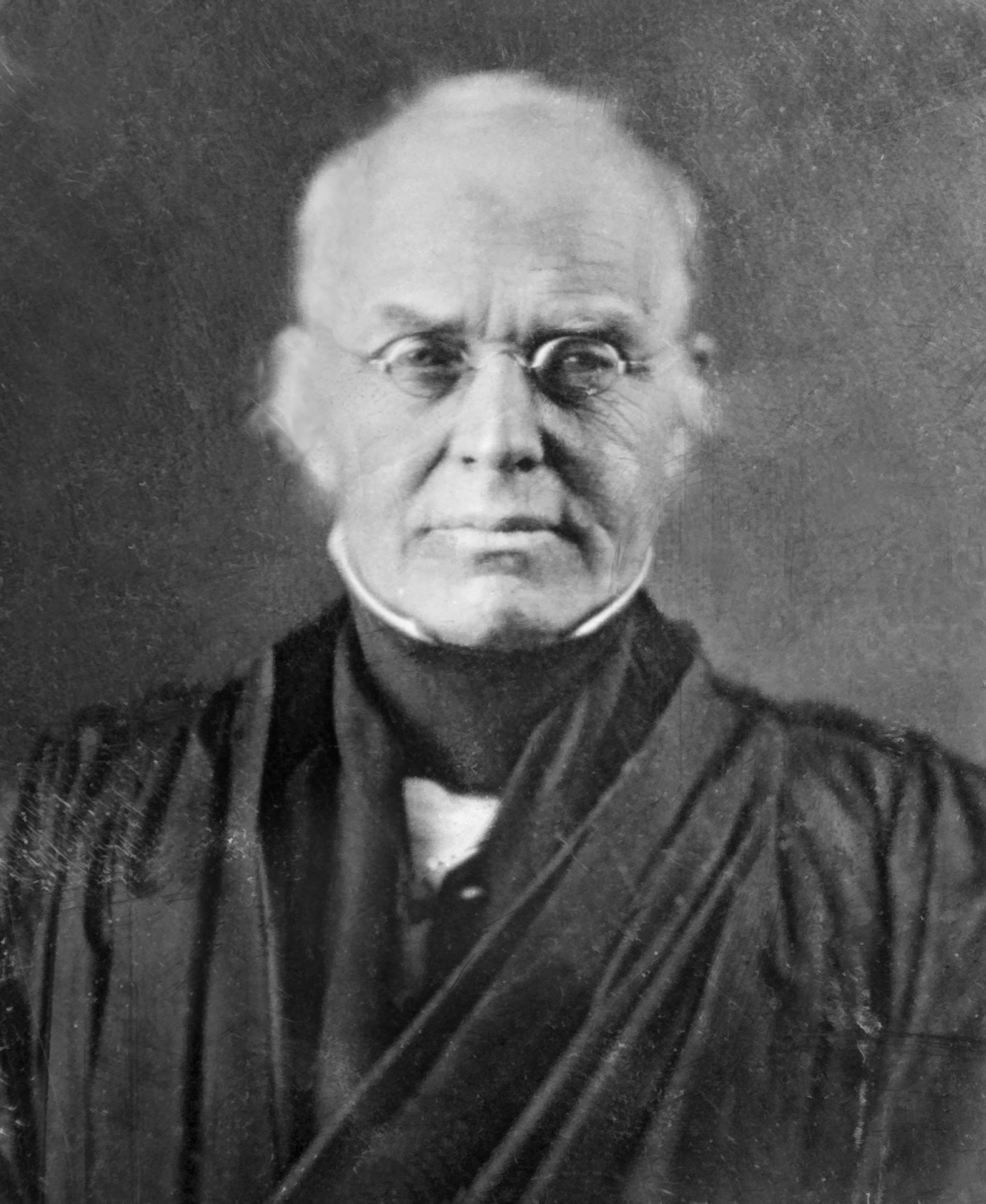
Associate Justice Joseph Story

Class actions survived in the United States thanks to the influence of Supreme Court Associate Justice Joseph Story, who imported the concept into US law through summary discussions in his two equity treatises as well as his opinion in West v. Randall (1820). However, Story did not necessarily endorse class actions, because he "could not conceive of a modern function or a coherent theory for representative litigation." Like most Americans of his time and ever since, Story took individualism for granted, which explains why he could not understand a rule allowing a court to bind an absent person to litigation purportedly conducted on that person's behalf.

The oldest predecessor to the class-action rule in the United States was in the Federal Equity Rules, specifically Equity Rule 48, promulgated in 1842.

Where the parties on either side are very numerous, and cannot, without manifest inconvenience and oppressive delays in the suit, be all brought before it, the court in its discretion may dispense with making all of them parties, and may proceed in the suit, having sufficient parties before it to represent all the adverse interests of the plaintiffs and the defendants in the suit properly before it. But in such cases, the decree shall be without prejudice to the rights and claims of all the absent parties.

This allowed for representative suits in situations where there were too many individual parties (which now forms the first requirement for class-action litigation – numerosity). However, this rule did not allow such suits to bind similarly situated absent parties, which rendered the rule ineffective. This flaw was a direct result of Story's inability to comprehend the old English Chancery cases on group litigation. However, Story's confusion was apparently typical of his time, as Harvard Law School dean Christopher Columbus Langdell also could not understand the old cases.

Within ten years, the Supreme Court interpreted Rule 48 in such a way so that it could apply to absent parties under certain circumstances, but only by ignoring the plain meaning of the rule. In the rules published in 1912, Equity Rule 48 was replaced with Equity Rule 38 as part of a major restructuring of the Equity Rules, and when federal courts merged their legal and equitable procedural systems in 1938, Equity Rule 38 became Rule 23 of the Federal Rules of Civil Procedure (FRCP).

==== Modern developments ====
A major revision of the FRCP in 1966 radically transformed Rule 23, made the opt-out class action the standard option, and gave birth to the modern class action. Entire treatises have been written since to summarize the huge mass of case law that sprang up from the 1966 revision of Rule 23. Just as medieval group litigation bound all members of the group regardless of whether they all actually appeared in court, the modern class action binds all members of the class, except for those who choose to opt out (if the rules permit them to do so). Arthur Taylor von Mehren characterized the American opt-out class action as the "most extreme development of collective civil litigation in the modern legal world".

The Advisory Committee that drafted the new Rule 23 in the mid-1960s was influenced by two major developments. First was the suggestion of Harry Kalven Jr. and Maurice Rosenfield in 1941 that class-action litigation by individual shareholders on behalf of all shareholders of a company could effectively supplement direct government regulation of securities markets and other similar markets. The second development was the rise of the civil rights movement, environmentalism and consumerism. The groups behind these movements, as well as many others in the 1960s, 1970s and 1980s, all turned to class actions as a means for achieving their goals. For example, a 1978 environmental law treatise reprinted the entire text of Rule 23 and mentioned "class actions" 14 times in its index.

Businesses targeted by class actions for inflicting massive aggregate harm have sought ways to avoid class actions altogether. In the 1990s, the US Supreme Court issued several decisions that strengthened the "federal policy favoring arbitration". In response, lawyers have added provisions to consumer contracts of adhesion called "collective action waivers", which prohibit those signing the contracts from bringing class-action suits. In 2011, the US Supreme Court ruled in a 5–4 decision in AT&T Mobility v. Concepcion that the Federal Arbitration Act of 1925 preempts state laws that prohibit contracts from disallowing class-action lawsuits, which will make it more difficult for consumers to file class-action lawsuits. The dissent pointed to a saving clause in the federal act which allowed states to determine how a contract or its clauses may be revoked.

In two major 21st-century cases, the Supreme Court ruled 5–4 against certification of class actions due to differences in each individual members' circumstances: first in Wal-Mart v. Dukes (2011) and later in Comcast Corp. v. Behrend (2013).

Companies may insert the phrase "may elect to resolve any claim by individual arbitration" into their consumer and employment contracts to use arbitration and prevent class-action lawsuits.

Rejecting arguments that they violated employees' rights to collective bargaining, and that modestly-valued consumer claims would be more efficiently litigated within the parameters of one lawsuit, the Supreme Court, in Epic Systems Corp. v. Lewis (2018), enabled the use of class action waivers. Citing its deference to freedom to contract principles, the Epic Systems opinion opened the door dramatically to the use of these waivers as a condition of employment, consumer purchases and the like. Some commentators in opposition to the ruling see it as a "death knell" to many employment and consumer class actions, and have increasingly pushed for legislation to circumvent it in hopes of reviving otherwise-underrepresented parties' ability to litigate on a group basis. Supporters (mostly pro-business) of the high court's ruling argue its holding is consistent with private contract principles. Many of those supporters had long-since argued that class action procedures were generally inconsistent with due process mandates and unnecessarily promoted litigation of otherwise small claims—thus heralding the ruling's anti-litigation effect.

In 2017, the US Supreme Court issued its opinion in Bristol-Myers Squibb Co. v. Superior Court (2017), holding that over five hundred plaintiffs from other states could not bring a consolidated mass action against the pharmaceutical giant in the State of California. This opinion may arguably render nationwide mass action and class action impossible in any single state besides the defendant's home state.

In 2020, the 11th Circuit Court of Appeals ruled that incentive awards are impermissible. Incentive awards are a relatively modest payment made to class representatives as part of a class settlement. The ruling was a response to an objector who claimed Rule 23 required that the fee petition be filed before the time frame for class member objections to be filed; and payments to the class representative violates doctrine from two US Supreme Court cases from the 1800s.

=== Statistics ===
As of 2010, there was no publicly maintained list of nonsecurities class-action settlements, although a securities class-action database exists in the Stanford Law School Securities Class Action Clearinghouse and several for-profit companies maintain lists of the securities settlements. One study of federal settlements required the researcher to manually search databases of lawsuits for the relevant records, although state class actions were not included due to the difficulty in gathering the information. Another source of data is US Bureau of Justice Statistics Civil Justice Survey of State Courts, which offers statistics for the year 2005.

== Advantages ==
Proponents of class actions state that they offer a number of advantages because they aggregate many individualized claims into one representational lawsuit.

First, aggregation can increase the efficiency of the legal process, and lower the costs of litigation. In cases with common questions of law and fact, aggregation of claims into a class action may avoid the necessity of repeating "days of the same witnesses, exhibits and issues from trial to trial". Jenkins v. Raymark Indus. Inc., 782 F.2d 468, 473 (5th Cir. 1986) (granting certification of a class action involving asbestos).

Second, a class action may overcome "the problem that small recoveries do not provide the incentive for any individual to bring a solo action prosecuting his or her rights". Amchem Prods., Inc. v. Windsor, 521 U.S. 591, 617 (1997) (quoting Mace v. Van Ru Credit Corp., 109 F.3d 388, 344 (7th Cir. 1997)). "A class action solves this problem by aggregating the relatively paltry potential recoveries into something worth someone's (usually an attorney's) labor." Amchem Prods., Inc., 521 U.S. at 617 (quoting Mace, 109 F.3d at 344). In other words, a class action ensures that a defendant who engages in widespread harm – but does so minimally against each individual plaintiff – must compensate those individuals for their injuries. For example, thousands of shareholders of a public company may have losses too small to justify separate lawsuits, but a class action can be brought efficiently on behalf of all shareholders. Perhaps even more important than compensation is that class treatment of claims may be the only way to impose the costs of wrongdoing on the wrongdoer, thus deterring future wrongdoing.

Third, class-action cases may be brought to purposely change behavior of a class of which the defendant is a member. Landeros v. Flood (1976) was a landmark case decided by the California Supreme Court that aimed at purposefully changing the behavior of doctors, encouraging them to report suspected child abuse. Otherwise, they would face the threat of civil action for damages in tort proximately flowing from the failure to report the suspected injuries. Previously, many physicians had remained reluctant to report cases of apparent child abuse, despite existing law that required it.

Fourth, in "limited fund" cases, a class action ensures that all plaintiffs receive relief and that early-filing plaintiffs do not raid the fund (i.e., the defendant) of all its assets before other plaintiffs may be compensated. See Ortiz v. Fibreboard Corp., 527 U.S. 815 (1999). A class action in such a situation centralizes all claims into one venue where a court can equitably divide the assets amongst all the plaintiffs if they win the case.

Finally, a class action avoids the situation where different court rulings could create "incompatible standards" of conduct for the defendant to follow. See Fed. R. Civ. P. 23(b)(1)(A). For example, a court might certify a case for class treatment where a number of individual bond-holders sue to determine whether they may convert their bonds to common stock. Refusing to litigate the case in one trial could result in different outcomes and inconsistent standards of conduct for the defendant corporation. Thus, courts will generally allow a class action in such a situation. See, e.g., Van Gemert v. Boeing Co., 259 F. Supp. 125 (S.D.N.Y. 1966).

Whether a class action is superior to individual litigation depends on the case and is determined by the judge's ruling on a motion for class certification. The Advisory Committee Note to Rule 23, for example, states that mass torts are ordinarily "not appropriate" for class treatment. Class treatment may not improve the efficiency of a mass tort because the claims frequently involve individualized issues of law and fact that will have to be re-tried on an individual basis. See Castano v. Am. Tobacco Co., 84 F.3d 734 (5th Cir. 1996) (rejecting nationwide class action against tobacco companies). Mass torts also involve high individual damage awards; thus, the absence of class treatment will not impede the ability of individual claimants to seek justice. Other cases, however, may be more conducive to class treatment.

The preamble to the Class Action Fairness Act of 2005, passed by the United States Congress, found:

Class-action lawsuits are an important and valuable part of the legal system when they permit the fair and efficient resolution of legitimate claims of numerous parties by allowing the claims to be aggregated into a single action against a defendant that has allegedly caused harm.

== Criticisms ==
There are several criticisms of class actions. The preamble to the Class Action Fairness Act stated that some abusive class actions have harmed class members possessing legitimate claims and defendants acting responsibly; have adversely affected interstate commerce; and have undermined public respect for the country's judicial system.

Class members often receive little or no benefit from class actions. Examples cited for this include large fees for the attorneys, while leaving class members with coupons or other awards of little or no value; unjustified awards are made to certain plaintiffs at the expense of other class members; and confusing notices are published that prevent class members from being able to fully understand and effectively exercise their rights.

For example, in the United States, class lawsuits sometimes bind all class members with a low settlement. These "coupon settlements" (which usually allow the plaintiffs to receive a small benefit such as a small check or a coupon for future services or products with the defendant company) are a way for a defendant to forestall major liability by precluding many people from litigating their claims separately, to recover reasonable compensation for the damages. Existing law requires judicial approval of all class-action settlements, and in most cases, class members are given a chance to opt out of class settlement. However, class members, despite opt-out notices, may be unaware of their right to opt-out because they did not receive the notice, did not read it, or did not understand it.

In the United States, the Class Action Fairness Act of 2005 addresses these concerns. An independent expert may scrutinize coupon settlements before judicial approval in order to ensure that the settlement will be of value to the class members. Further, if the action provides for settlement in coupons, "the portion of any attorney's fee award to class counsel that is attributable to the award of the coupons shall be based on the value to class members of the coupons that are redeemed".

A common critique is that class actions are a form of judicially sanctioned extortion. The extortion thesis was first articulated by law professor Milton Handler, who published a law review article in 1971 calling the class action a form of "legalized blackmail". It has garnered the support of a significant minority of the justices of the U.S. Supreme Court, along with prominent judges like Henry Friendly and Richard Posner. However, empirical studies have generally found the extortion thesis to be "overstated".

== Ethics ==
Class action cases present significant ethical challenges. Defendants can hold reverse auctions and any of several parties can engage in collusive settlement discussions. Subclasses may have interests that diverge greatly from the class but may be treated the same. Proposed settlements could offer some groups (such as former customers) much greater benefits than others. In one paper presented at an ABA conference on class actions in 2007, authors commented that "competing cases can also provide opportunities for collusive settlement discussions and reverse auctions by defendants anxious to resolve their new exposure at the most economic cost".

Advertising or otherwise soliciting to find lead plaintiffs may also be unethical, as the plaintiff may not genuinely be aggrieved.

== Defendant class action ==
Although normally plaintiffs are the class, defendant class actions are also possible. For example, in 2005, the Roman Catholic Archdiocese of Portland in Oregon was sued as part of the Catholic priest sex-abuse scandal. All parishioners of the Archdiocese's churches were cited as a defendant class. This was done to include their assets (local churches) in any settlement. Where both the plaintiffs and the defendants have been organized into court-approved classes, the action is called a bilateral class action.

In the United States, only a few hundred defendant class actions have been filed (mostly in securities cases and constitutional challenges), and circuit courts are split as to whether injunctive relief is available against defendant classes at all.

== Mass actions ==
In a class action, the plaintiff seeks court approval to litigate on behalf of a group of similarly situated persons. Not every plaintiff looks for or could obtain such approval. As a procedural alternative, plaintiff's counsel may attempt to sign up every similarly situated person that counsel can find as a client. Plaintiff's counsel can then join the claims of all of these persons in one complaint, a so-called "mass action", hoping to have the same efficiencies and economic leverage as if a class had been certified.

Because mass actions operate outside the detailed procedures laid out for class actions, they can pose special difficulties for both plaintiffs, defendants, and the court. For example, settlement of class actions follows a predictable path of negotiation with class counsel and representatives, court scrutiny, and notice. There may not be a way to uniformly settle all of the many claims brought via a mass action. Some states permit plaintiff's counsel to settle for all the mass action plaintiffs according to a majority vote, for example. Other states, such as New Jersey, require each plaintiff to approve the settlement of that plaintiff's own individual claims.

== Class action legislation ==
=== Argentina ===
Class actions were recognized in "Halabi" leading case (Supreme Court, 2009).

=== Australia and New Zealand ===
Class actions became part of the Australian legal landscape only when the Federal Parliament amended the Federal Court of Australia Act in 1992 to introduce "representative proceedings", the equivalent of the American "class actions".

Likewise, class actions appeared slowly in the New Zealand legal system. However, a group can bring litigation through the action of a representative under the High Court Rules which provide that one or a multitude of persons may sue on behalf of, or for the benefit of, all persons "with the same interest in the subject matter of a proceeding". The presence and expansion of litigation funders have been playing a significant role in the emergence of class actions in New Zealand. For example, the "Fair Play on Fees" proceedings in relation to penalty fees charged by banks were funded by Litigation Lending Services (LLS), a company specializing in the funding and management of litigation in Australia and New Zealand. It was the biggest class-action suit in New Zealand history.

=== Austria ===
The Austrian Code of Civil Procedure (Zivilprozessordnung – ZPO) does not provide for a special proceeding for complex class-action litigation. However, Austrian consumer organizations (Verein für Konsumenteninformation (VKI) and the Federal Chamber of Labour / Bundesarbeitskammer) have brought claims on behalf of hundreds or even thousands of consumers. In these cases, the individual consumers assigned their claims to one entity, who has then brought an ordinary (two-party) lawsuit over the assigned claims. The monetary benefits were redistributed among the class. This technique, labeled as "class action Austrian style", allows for a significant reduction of overall costs. The Austrian Supreme Court, in a judgment, confirmed the legal admissibility of these lawsuits under the condition that all claims are essentially based on the same grounds.

The Austrian Parliament unanimously requested the Austrian Federal Minister for Justice to examine the possibility of new legislation providing for a cost-effective and appropriate way to deal with mass claims. Together with the Austrian Ministry for Social Security, Generations and Consumer Protection, the Justice Ministry opened the discussion with a conference held in Vienna in June 2005. With the aid of a group of experts from many fields, the Justice Ministry began drafting the new law in September 2005. With the individual positions varying greatly, a political consensus could not be reached.

=== Canada ===
Provincial laws in Canada allow class actions. All provinces permit plaintiff classes and some permit defendant classes. Quebec was the first province to enact class proceedings legislation, in 1978. Ontario was next, with the Class Proceedings Act, 1992. As of 2008, 9 of 10 provinces had enacted comprehensive class actions legislation. In Prince Edward Island, where no comprehensive legislation exists, following the decision of the Supreme Court of Canada in Western Canadian Shopping Centres Inc. v. Dutton, [2001] 2 S.C.R. 534, class actions may be advanced under a local rule of court. The Federal Court of Canada permits class actions under Part V.1 of the Federal Courts Rules.

Legislation in Saskatchewan, Manitoba, Ontario, and Nova Scotia expressly or by judicial opinion has been read to allow for what are informally known as national "opt-out" class actions, whereby residents of other provinces may be included in the class definition and potentially be bound by the court's judgment on common issues unless they opt out in a prescribed manner and time. Court rulings have determined that this permits a court in one province to include residents of other provinces in the class action on an "opt-out" basis.

Judicial opinions have indicated that provincial legislative national opt-out powers should not be exercised to interfere with the ability of another province to certify a parallel class action for residents of other provinces. The first court to certify will generally exclude residents of provinces whose courts have certified a parallel class action. However, in the Vioxx litigation, two provincial courts certified overlapping class actions whereby Canadian residents were class members in two class actions in two provinces. Both decisions are under appeal.

Other legislation may provide for representative actions on behalf of a large number of plaintiffs, independent of class action procedures. For instance, under Ontario's Condominium Act, a condominium's governing corporation may launch a lawsuit on behalf of the owners for damage to the condominium's common elements, even though the corporation does not own the common elements.

The largest class action suit in Canada was settled in 2005 after Nora Bernard initiated efforts that led to an estimated 79,000 survivors of Canada's residential school system suing the Canadian government. The settlement amounted to upwards of $5 billion.

=== Chile ===
Chile approved class actions in 2004. The Chilean model is technically an opt-out issue class action, followed by a compensatory stage which can be collective or individual. This means that the class action is designed to declare the defendant generally liable with erga omnes effects if and only if the defendant is found liable, and the declaratory judgment can be used then to pursue damages in the same procedure or in individual ones in different jurisdictions. If the latter is the case, the liability cannot be discussed, but only the damages. There under the Chilean procedural rules, one particular case works as an opt-out class action for damages. This is the case when defendants can identify and compensate consumers directly, i.e. because it is their banking institution. In such cases, the judge can skip the compensatory stage and order redress directly. Since 2005 more than 100 cases have been filed, mostly by Servicio Nacional del Consumidor [SERNAC], the Chilean consumer protection agency. Salient cases have been Condecus v. BancoEstado and SERNAC v. La Polar.

=== France ===
Under French law, an association can represent the collective interests of consumers; however, each claimant must be individually named in the lawsuit. On January 4, 2005, President Chirac urged changes that would provide greater consumer protection. A draft bill was proposed in April 2006 but did not pass.

Following the change of majority in France in 2012, the new government proposed introducing class actions into French law. The project of loi Hamon of May 2013 aimed to limit the class action to consumer and competition disputes. The law was passed on March 1, 2014.

=== Germany ===
Class actions are generally not permitted in Germany, as German law does not recognize the concept of a targeted class being affected by certain actions. This requires each plaintiff to individually prove that they were affected by an action, and present their individual damages, and prove the causality between both parties.

Joint litigation (Streitgenossenschaft) is a legal act that may permit plaintiffs that are in the same legal community with respect to the dispute, or are entitled by the same factual or legal reason. These are not typically regarded as class action suits, as each individual plaintiff is entitled to compensation for their individual, incurred damages and not as a result of being a member of a class.

The combination of court cases (Prozessverbindung) is another method that permits a judge to combine multiple separate court cases into a single trial with a single verdict. According to § 147 ZPO, this is only permissible if all cases are regarding the same factual and legal event and basis.

==== Mediation procedure ====
A genuine extension of the legal effect of a court decision beyond the parties involved in the proceedings is offered under corporate law. This procedure applies to the review of stock payoffs under the Stock Corporation Act (Aktiengesetz). Pursuant to Sec. 13 Paragraph 2 of the Mediation Procedure Act (Spruchverfahrensgesetz), the court decision concerning the dismissal or direction of a binding arrangement of an adequate compensation is effective for and against all shareholders, including those who have already agreed to a previous settlement in this matter.

==== Investor model case proceedings ====
The Capital Investor Model Case Act (Kapitalanleger-Musterverfahrensgesetz) is an attempt to enable model cases to be brought by a large number of potentially affected parties in the event of disputes, limited to the investment market. In contrast to US class actions, each affected party must file a lawsuit in its own name in order to participate in the model proceedings.

==== Model Declaratory Action ====
Effective on November 1, 2018, the Code of Civil Procedure (Zivilprozessordnung) introduced the Model Declaratory Action (§ 606 ZPO) that created the ability to bundle similar claims by many affected parties efficiently into one proceeding.

Registered Consumer Protection Associations can file – if they represent at least 10 individuals – for a (general) judicial finding whether the factual and legal requirements for of claims or legal relationships are met or not. These individuals have to register in order to inhibit their claims. Since these Adjudications are more of a general nature, each individual must assert their claims in their own court proceedings. The competent court is bound by the Model Declaratory Action decision.

==== Associate Action ====
German law also recognizes the associative action (Verbandsklage), which is comparable to the class action and is predominantly used in environmental law. In civil law, the associative action is represented by a foreign body in the matter of asserting and enforcing individual claims and the claimant can no longer control the proceedings.

==== Class action with relation to the United States ====
Class actions can be brought by Germans in the US for events in Germany if the facts of the case relate to the US. For example, in the case of the Eschede train disaster, the lawsuit was allowed because several aggrieved parties came from the US and had purchased rail tickets there.

=== India ===
Decisions of the Indian Supreme Court in the 1980s loosened strict locus standi requirements to permit the filing of suits on behalf of rights of deprived sections of society by public-minded individuals or bodies. Although not strictly "class action litigation" as it is understood in American law, public interest litigation arose out of the wide powers of judicial review granted to the Supreme Court of India and the various High Courts under Article 32 and Article 226 of the Constitution of India. The sort of remedies sought from courts in public interest litigation go beyond mere award of damages to all affected groups, and have sometimes (controversially) gone on to include Court monitoring of the implementation of legislation and even the framing of guidelines in the absence of Parliamentary legislation.

However, this innovative jurisprudence did not help the victims of the Bhopal gas tragedy, who were unable to fully prosecute a class-action litigation (as understood in the American sense) against Union Carbide due to procedural rules that would make such litigation impossible to conclude and unwieldy to carry out. Instead, the Government of India exercised its right of parens patriae to appropriate all the claims of the victims and proceeded to litigate on their behalf, first in the New York courts and later, in the Indian courts. Ultimately, the matter was settled between the Union of India and Union Carbide (in a settlement overseen by the Supreme Court of India) for a sum of ₹760 crore (US$81 million) as a complete settlement of all claims of all victims for all time to come.

Public interest litigation has now broadened in scope to cover larger and larger groups of citizens who may be affected by government inaction. Examples of this trend include the conversion of all public transport in the city of Delhi from diesel engines to compressed natural gas engines on the basis of the orders of the Delhi High Court; the monitoring of forest use by the High Courts and the Supreme Court to ensure that there is no unjustified loss of forest cover; and the directions mandating the disclosure of assets of electoral candidates for the Houses of Parliament and State Assembly.

The Supreme Court has observed that the PIL has tended to become a means to gain publicity or obtain relief contrary to constitutionally valid legislation and policy. Observers point out that many High Courts and certain Supreme Court judges are reluctant to entertain PILs filed by non-governmental organizations and activists, citing concerns of separation of powers and parliamentary sovereignty.

=== Ireland ===
In Irish law, there is no such thing as a "class action" per se. Third-party litigation funding (champerty) is prohibited under Irish law. Instead, there is the 'representative action' (Irish: gníomh ionadaíoch) or 'test case' (cás samplach). A representative action is "where one claimant or defendant, with the same interest as a group of claimants or defendants in an action, institutes or defends proceedings on behalf of that group of claimants or defendants."

Some test cases in Ireland have included:

- the CervicalCheck cancer scandal
- financial product misselling
- damages claims brought by Irish hauliers against price-fixing by European truck makers

=== Italy ===
Italy has class action legislation. Consumer associations can file claims on behalf of groups of consumers to obtain judicial orders against corporations that cause injury or damage to consumers. These types of claims are increasing, and Italian courts have allowed them against banks that continue to apply compound interest on retail clients' current account overdrafts. Class action is regulated by art. 140 bis of the Italian consumers' code and has been in force since 1 July 2009. On May 19, 2021, the reform of the Italian legal framework on class actions finally entered into force. The new rules, designed by Law n. 31 and published on April 18, 2019, (Law n. 31/2019), were initially intended to become effective on April 19, 2020, but were delayed twice. The new rules on class actions are now included in the Italian Civil Procedure Code (ICPC). Overall, the new class action appears to be a viable instrument which, through a system of economic incentives, could overcome the rational apathy of small-claims holders and ensure redress.

=== Netherlands ===
Dutch law allows associations (verenigingen) and foundations (stichtingen) to bring a so-called collective action on behalf of other persons, provided they can represent the interests of such persons according to their by-laws (statuten) (section 3:305a Dutch Civil Code). All types of actions are permitted. This includes a claim for monetary damages, provided the event occurred after 15 November 2016 (pursuant to new legislation which entered into force 1 January 2020). Most class actions over the past decade have been in the field of securities fraud and financial services. The acting association or foundation may come to a collective settlement with the defendant. The settlement may also include – and usually primarily consists of – monetary compensation of damages. Such settlement can be declared binding for all injured parties by the Amsterdam Court of Appeal (section 7:907 Dutch Civil Code). The injured parties have an opt-out right during the opt-out period set by the Court, usually 3 to 6 months. Settlements involving injured parties from outside the Netherlands can also be declared binding by the Court. Since US courts are reluctant to take up class actions brought on behalf of injured parties not residing in the US who have suffered damages due to acts or omissions committed outside the US, combinations of US class actions and Dutch collective actions may come to a settlement that covers plaintiffs worldwide. An example of this is the Royal Dutch Shell Oil Reserves Settlement that was declared binding upon both US and non-US plaintiffs.

=== Poland ===
Pozew zbiorowy or class action has been allowed under Polish law since July 19, 2010. A minimum of 10 persons, suing based on the same law, is required.

=== Russia ===
Collective litigation has been allowed under Russian law since 2002. Basic criteria are, like in the US, numerosity, commonality, and typicality.

=== Spain ===
Spanish law allows nominated consumer associations to take action to protect the interests of consumers. A number of groups already have the power to bring collective or class actions: certain consumer associations, bodies legally constituted to defend the "collective interest" and groups of injured parties.

Recent changes to Spanish civil procedure rules include the introduction of a quasi-class action right for certain consumer associations to claim damages on behalf of unidentified classes of consumers. The rules require consumer associations to represent an adequate number of affected parties who have suffered the same harm. Also, any judgment made by the Spanish court will list the individual beneficiaries or, if that is not possible, conditions that need to be fulfilled for a party to benefit from a judgment.

=== Switzerland ===
Swiss law does not allow for any form of class action. When the government proposed a new federal code of civil procedure in 2006, replacing the cantonal codes of civil procedure, it rejected the introduction of class actions, arguing that

[It] is alien to European legal thought to allow somebody to exercise rights on the behalf of a large number of people if these do not participate as parties in the action. ... Moreover, the class action is controversial even in its country of origin, the U.S., because it can result in significant procedural problems. ... Finally, the class action can be openly or discretely abused. The sums sued for are usually enormous, so that the respondent can be forced to concede, if they do not want to face sudden huge indebtness and insolvency (so-called legal blackmail).

=== United Kingdom ===
==== England and Wales ====
The Civil Procedure Rules of the courts of England and Wales came into force in 1999 and have provided for group litigation orders in limited circumstances (under Part 19.21–26, supplemented by Practice Direction 19B). HM Courts and Tribunals Service maintains a public list of group litigation orders, and as of January 2025 there have been 124 orders granted.

A sectoral mechanism was adopted by the Consumer Rights Act 2015, taking effect on October 1, 2015. Under the provisions therein, opt-in or opt-out collective procedures may be certified for breaches of competition law. This is currently the closest mechanism to a class action in England and Wales.

==== Scotland ====
A similar approach exists in Scotland to bring group proceedings under Part 4 of the Civil Litigation (Expenses and Group Proceedings) (Scotland) Act 2018. The Scottish Courts and Tribunals Service maintain a public list of group proceedings cases.

=== United States ===
In the United States, the class representative, also called a lead plaintiff, named plaintiff, or representative plaintiff, is the named party in a class-action lawsuit. Although the class representative is named as a party to the litigation, the court must approve the class representative when it certifies the lawsuit as a class action.

The class representative must be able to represent the interests of all the members of the class, by being typical of the class members and not having conflicts with them. He or she is responsible for hiring the attorney, filing the lawsuit, consulting on the case, and agreeing to any settlement. In exchange, the class representative may be entitled to compensation (at the court's discretion) out of the recovery amount.

==== Standing ====
In securities class actions that allege violations of Section 11 of the Securities Act of 1933, "officers and directors are liable together with the corporation for material misrepresentations in the registration statement."

To have standing to sue under Section 11 of the 1933 Act in a class action, a plaintiff must be able to prove that he can trace his shares to the registration statement in question, as to which there is alleged a material misstatement or omission. In the absence of an ability to actually trace his shares, such as when securities issued at multiple times are held by the depository trust company in a fungible bulk and physical tracing of particular shares may be impossible, the plaintiff may be barred from pursuing his claim for lack of standing.

==== Federal courts ====
In federal courts, class actions are governed by Federal Rules of Civil Procedure Rule 23 and 28 U.S.C.A. § 1332(d). Cases in federal courts are only allowed to proceed as class actions if the court has jurisdiction to hear the case, and if the case meets the criteria set out in Rule 23. In the vast majority of federal class actions, the class is acting as the plaintiff. However, Rule 23 also provides for defendant class actions.

Typically, federal courts are thought to be more favorable for defendants, and state courts more favorable for plaintiffs. Many class actions are filed initially in state court. The defendant will frequently try to remove the case to federal court. The Class Action Fairness Act of 2005 increases defendants' ability to remove state cases to federal court by giving federal courts original jurisdiction for all class actions with damages exceeding $5,000,000 exclusive of interest and costs. The Class Action Fairness Act contains carve-outs for, among other things, shareholder class actions covered by the Private Securities Litigation Reform Act of 1995 and those concerning internal corporate governance issues (the latter typically being brought as shareholder derivative actions in the state courts of Delaware, the state of incorporation of most large corporations).

===== Jurisdiction =====
Class actions may be brought in federal court if the claim arises under federal law or if the claim falls under 28 U.S.C. § 1332(d). Under § 1332(d)(2) the federal district courts have original jurisdiction over any civil action where the amount in controversy exceeds $5,000,000 and

- any member of a class of plaintiffs is a citizen of a State different from any defendant; or
- any member of a class of plaintiffs is a foreign state or a citizen or subject of a foreign state and any defendant is a citizen of a State; or
- any member of a class of plaintiffs is a citizen of a State and any defendant is a foreign state or a citizen or subject of a foreign state.

Nationwide plaintiff classes are possible, but such suits must have a commonality of issues across state lines. This may be difficult if the civil law in the various states lack significant commonalities. Large class actions brought in federal court frequently are consolidated for pre-trial purposes through the device of multidistrict litigation (MDL). It is also possible to bring class actions under state law, and in some cases the court may extend its jurisdiction to all the members of the class, including out of state (or even internationally) as the key element is the jurisdiction that the court has over the defendant.

===== Class certification under Rule 23 =====
For the case to proceed as a class action and bind absent class members, the court must certify the class under Rule 23 on a motion from the party wishing to proceed on a class basis. For a class to be certified, the moving party must meet all of the criteria listed under Rule 23(a), and at least one of the criteria listed under Rule 23(b).

The 23(a) criteria are referred to as numerosity, commonality, typicality, and adequacy. Numerosity refers to the number of people in the class. To be certified, the class has to have enough members that simply adding each of them as a named party to the lawsuit would be impractical. There is no bright-line rule to determine numerosity, but classes with hundreds of members are generally deemed to be sufficiently numerous. To satisfy commonality, there must be a common question of law and fact such that "determination of its truth or falsity will resolve an issue that is central to the validity of each one of the claims in one stroke". The typicality requirement ensures that the claims or defenses of the named plaintiff are typical of those of everyone else in the class. Finally, adequacy requirement states that the named plaintiff must fairly and adequately represent the interests of the absent class members.

Rule 23(b)(3) allows class certification if "questions of law or fact common to class members predominate over any questions affecting only individual members, and that a class action is superior to other available methods for fairly and efficiently adjudicating the controversy."

===== Notice and settlement =====
Due process requires in most cases that notice describing the class action be sent, published, or broadcast to class members. As part of this notice procedure, there may have to be several notices, first a notice allowing class members to opt out of the class, i.e. if individuals wish to proceed with their own litigation they are entitled to do so, only to the extent that they give timely notice to the class counsel or the court that they are opting out. Second, if there is a settlement proposal, the court will usually direct the class counsel to send a settlement notice to all the members of the certified class, informing them of the details of the proposed settlement.

==== State courts ====
Since 1938, many states have adopted rules similar to the FRCP. However, some states, like California, have civil procedure systems, which deviate significantly from the federal rules; the California Codes provide for four separate types of class actions. As a result, there are two separate treatises devoted solely to the complex topic of California class actions. As of March 2024, only Virginia and Massachusetts do not provide for any class actions. Others, such as New York, limit the types of claims that may be brought as class actions.

== See also ==
- Arbitration clause, a contract clause that attempts to prevent lawsuits by requiring arbitration in a private forum
- Bill of Peace, an English predecessor to class actions
- Class Action, 1991 American legal drama film
- Class action waiver, a provision in some contracts which prevents one or both parties from filing a class action
- Collective redress, a similar legal framework under development in the European Union
- Dukes v. Wal-Mart (2011), the largest civil rights class-action lawsuit to date
- List of class action lawsuits
- Public Interest Litigation, a similar system adopted in India
- Securities Class Action
