= Vinzenz Bronzin =

Italian mathematics professor

Vinzenz Bronzin (born 1872 in Rovigno – died 1970 in Trieste) was an Italian mathematics professor, known today for an early (rediscovered) option pricing formula, similar to, and predating, the Black–Scholes 1973 formula; he also provided a formulation of put–call parity, written up formally only in 1969 by Stoll.

Bronzin was born in Rovigno (now Rovinj), Istria. He studied engineering at the Vienna Polytechnic Institute, and then mathematics and pedagogics at the University of Vienna. He was made a professor at the Accademia di Commercio e Nautica, Trieste, Italy, in 1900; his focus was "Political and Commercial Arithmetic", which included actuarial science and probability theory. In 1910 he accepted the position of director. In 1937 he resigned from all of his positions at the Academia at the age of 65.

In 1908 Bronzin published his Theorie der Prämiengeschäfte (German: "Theory of Premium Contracts") discussing a then current type of option contract. Almost every element of modern option pricing can be found in Bronzin's book; however, like Louis Bachelier's now famous dissertation (1900), the work seems to have been forgotten shortly after it was published. Bronzin's "methodological setup is completely different from Bachelier’s," at least in terms of the underlying stochastic framework; he takes a much more "pragmatic" approach, directly making assumptions on the share price distribution at maturity, and deriving a "rich set of closed form solutions for the value of options."

== See also ==
- Louis Bachelier
- Jules Regnault
