= Bill of peace =

Procedural tool in historical equity jurisprudence

A bill of peace was an English court practice used in the 17th and 18th centuries for legal disputes involving multiple parties that shared common aspects. It allowed the English Court of Chancery to settle the rights of parties, a group known as the "multitude", in one suit, in equity court.

If the equity court allowed the matter to proceed as a bill of peace, the results of the suit would bind all members of the multitude, whether they actually appeared in the case or not.

The bill was limited until 1873 to equitable relief, including an injunction, an accounting or a type of declaratory judgment called a decree. It could not be used for monetary relief and in this respect was similar to a representative action.

The practice was also used in the United States in mass tort or similar situations in the 19th and early 20th centuries. Justice Joseph Story, who served on the U.S. Supreme Court from 1811 to 1845, advocated the development of the bill of peace in the United States. The Supreme Court of the United States used the bill of peace concepts in development of the implementation of class action litigation. This evolution continued with Federal Equity Rule 48, in place in the United States from 1842 to 1912, which provided for a class action.

The origins of the bill of peace practices, as well as class action lawsuits, may be centuries earlier, beginning as early as 1309 in the decisions of the English quasi-judicial counsel then known as the General Eyre.
