= Financial market efficiency =

Economics concepts

There are several concepts of efficiency for a financial market. The most widely discussed is informational or price efficiency, which is a measure of how quickly and completely the price of a single asset reflects available information about the asset's value. Other concepts include functional/operational efficiency, which is inversely related to the costs that investors bear for making transactions, and allocative efficiency, which is a measure of how far a market channels funds from ultimate lenders to ultimate borrowers in such a way that the funds are used in the most productive manner.

== Market efficiency types ==
Three common types of market efficiency are allocative, operational and informational. However, other kinds of market efficiency are also recognised.

James Tobin identified four efficiency types that could be present in a financial market:

1. Information arbitrage efficiency

Asset prices fully reflect all of the privately available information (the least demanding requirement for efficient markets, since arbitrage includes realizable, risk free transactions)

Arbitrage involves taking advantage of price similarities of financial instruments between 2 or more markets by trading to generate profits.

It involves only risk-free transactions and the information used for trading is obtained at no cost. Therefore, the profit opportunities are not fully exploited, and it can be said that arbitrage is a result of market inefficiency.

This reflects the semi-strong efficiency model.

2. Fundamental valuation efficiency

Asset prices reflect the expected flows of payments associated with holding the assets (profit forecasts are correct, they attract investors)

Fundamental valuation involves lower risks and less profit opportunities. It refers to the accuracy of the predicted return on the investment.

Financial markets are characterized by predictability and inconsistent misalignments that force the prices to always deviate from their fundamental valuations.

This reflects the weak information efficiency model.

3. Full insurance efficiency

This ensures the continuous delivery of goods and services in all contingencies.

4. Functional/Operational efficiency

The products and services available at the financial markets are provided for the least cost and are directly useful to the participants.

Every financial market will contain a unique mixture of the identified efficiency types.

== Informational efficiency ==
=== Informational efficiency levels ===
In the 1970s Eugene Fama defined an efficient financial market as "one in which prices always fully reflect available information".

Fama identified three levels of market efficiency:

1. Weak-form efficiency

Prices of the securities instantly and fully reflect all information of the past prices. This means future price movements cannot be predicted by using past prices, i.e past data on stock prices is of no use in predicting future stock price changes.

2. Semi-strong efficiency

Asset prices fully reflect all of the publicly available information. Therefore, only investors with additional inside information could have an advantage in the market. Any price anomalies are quickly found out and the stock market adjusts.

3. Strong-form efficiency

Asset prices fully reflect all of the public and inside information available. Therefore, no one can have an advantage in the market in predicting prices since there is no data that would provide any additional value to the investors.

Price Changes Reflect
| Forms | Past Market Data | Public Information | Private Information |
|---|---|---|---|
| Weak | Yes | No | No |
| Semi-strong | Yes | Yes | No |
| Strong | Yes | Yes | Yes |

=== Efficient-market hypothesis ===
Fama also created the efficient-market hypothesis (EMH), which states that in any given time, the prices on the market already reflect all known information, and also change fast to reflect new information.

Therefore, no one could outperform the market by using the same information that is already available to all investors, except through luck.

=== Random walk theory ===
Another theory related to the efficient market hypothesis created by Louis Bachelier is the "random walk" theory, which states that prices in the financial markets evolve randomly.

Therefore, identifying trends or patterns of price changes in a market can't be used to predict the future value of financial instruments.

=== Evidence ===
==== Evidence of financial market efficiency ====
- Predicting future asset prices is not always accurate (represents weak efficiency form)
- Asset prices always reflect all new available information quickly (represents semi-strong efficiency form)
- Investors can't outperform on the market often (represents strong efficiency form)

==== Evidence of financial market inefficiency ====
- There is a vast literature in academic finance dealing with the momentum effect that was identified by Jegadeesh and Titman. Stocks that have performed relatively well (poorly) over the past 3 to 12 months continue to do well (poorly) over the next 3 to 12 months. The momentum strategy is long recent winners and shorts recent losers, and produces positive risk-adjusted average returns. Being simply based on past stock returns that are functions of past prices (dividends can be ignored), the momentum effect produces strong evidence against weak-form market efficiency, and has been observed in the stock returns of most countries, in industry returns, and in national equity market indices. Moreover, Fama has accepted that momentum is the premier anomaly.
- January effect (repeating and predictable price movements and patterns occur on the market)
- Stock market crashes, Asset Bubbles, and Credit Bubbles
- Investors that often outperform on the market such as Warren Buffett, institutional investors, and corporations trading in their own stock
- Certain consumer credit market prices don't adjust to legal changes that affect future losses

=== Conclusion ===
Financial market efficiency is an important topic in the world of finance. While most financiers believe the markets are neither efficient in the absolute sense, nor extremely inefficient, many disagree where on the efficiency line the world's markets fall.

== Bibliography ==
- Pilbeam, Keith (2005). Finance and Financial Markets. Palgrave Macmillan. ISBN 978-1-4039-4835-9.
- Mishkin, Frederic (1998). The economics of money, banking, and financial markets. Addison Wesley. ISBN 978-0-321-01440-5.
- Hasan, Iftekhar; Hunter, William C. (2004). Bank and financial market efficiency. Emerald Group. ISBN 978-0-7623-1099-9.
- Richard, Mark; Vecer, Jan (1 February 2021). "Efficiency Testing of Prediction Markets: Martingale Approach, Likelihood Ratio and Bayes Factor Analysis". Risks. 9 (2): 31. doi:10.3390/risks9020031. hdl:10419/258120.
- Davidson, Paul. Financial markets, money and the real world. Edward Elgar Publishing, 2002.
- Emilio Colombo, Luca Matteo Stanca. Financial Market Imperfections and Corporate Decisions. Springer, 2006.
- Frisch, Ragnar Anton Kittel. Econometrica. Econometric Society, JSTOR, 1943.
- Leffler, George Leland. The Stock Market. 2. Ronald Press Co., 1951.
- Marc, Levinson. Guide to Financial Markets. 3. Bloomberg Press, 2003.
- Peters, Edgar E. Fractal Market Analysis: Applying Chaos Theory to Investment and Economics. John Wiley and Sons, 1994.
- Teall, John L. Financial market analytics. Greenwood Publishing Group, 1999.
