= K. Victor Chow =

K. Victor Chow is Distinguished Professor of Global Business and Finance at West Virginia University, where he directs the Center for Asian Business. He has a bachelor's degree from Chinese Culture University in Taiwan, and a master's degree and Ph.D. from the University of Alabama. With Karen Denning, he is known for the Chow–Denning test, a statistical tool for checking whether a market follows the random walk hypothesis.
