= Adaptive market hypothesis =

Economic theory

The adaptive market hypothesis, as proposed by Andrew Lo is an attempt to reconcile economic theories based on the efficient market hypothesis (which implies that markets are efficient) with behavioral economics, by applying the principles of evolution to financial interactions: competition, adaptation, and natural selection. This view is part of a larger school of thought known as Evolutionary Economics.

Under this approach, the traditional models of modern financial economics can coexist with behavioral models. This suggests that investors are capable of an optimal dynamic allocation. Lo argues that much of what behaviorists cite as counterexamples to economic rationality—loss aversion, overconfidence, overreaction, and other behavioral biases—are consistent with an evolutionary model of individuals adapting to a changing environment using simple heuristics. Even fear and greed, which are viewed as the usual culprits in the failure of rational thinking by the behaviorists, are driven by evolutionary forces.

== Details ==
According to Lo, the adaptive market hypothesis can be viewed as a new version of the efficient market hypothesis, derived from evolutionary principles:

Prices reflect as much information as dictated by the combination of environmental conditions and the number and nature of "species" in the economy.

By species, he means distinct groups of market participants, each behaving in a common manner—pension fund managers, retail investors, market makers, hedge fund managers, etc.

If multiple members of a single group are competing for rather scarce resources within a single market, then that market is likely to be highly efficient (for example, the market for 10-year U.S. Treasury notes, which reflects most relevant information very quickly indeed). On the other hand, if a small number of species are competing for rather abundant resources, then that market will be less efficient (for example, the market for oil paintings from the Italian Renaissance).

Market efficiency cannot be evaluated in a vacuum, but is highly context-dependent and dynamic. Shortly stated, the degree of market efficiency is related to environmental factors characterizing market ecology, such as the number of competitors in the market, the magnitude of profit opportunities available, and the adaptability of the market participants. Lo assumes that preference drives the system rather than vice versa.

== Implications ==
The adaptive market hypothesis has several implications that differentiate it from the efficient market hypothesis:

1. To the extent that a relation between risk and reward exists, it is unlikely to be stable over time. This relation is influenced by the relative sizes and preferences of populations and by institutional aspects. As these factors change, any risk/reward relation is likely to change as well.
2. There are opportunities for arbitrage.
3. Investment strategies—including quantitatively, fundamentally and technically based methods—will perform well in certain environments and poorly in others. An example is risk arbitrage, which has been unprofitable for some time after the decline in investment banking in 2001. As M&A activities increased, risk arbitrage regained its popularity.
4. The primary objective is survival; profit and utility maximization are secondary. When a multiplicity of capabilities that work under different environmental conditions evolves, investment managers are less prone to become extinct after rapid changes.
5. The key to survival is innovation: as the risk/reward relation varies, the better way of achieving a consistent level of expected returns is to adapt to changing market conditions.

== Evidence ==
Evidence shows that hedge funds profit from trading with less sophisticated investors but also make the profitable trades endogenously risky, consistent with the premise of the adaptive market hypothesis that the risk and returns are determined endogenously as different species of investors trade with one another.

== Applications ==
=== Evolution of Stock markets, Commodities, Energy Investments, Precious Metals, and Islamic Calendar Anomalies ===
In 2017, researchers from Bahria University related the Adaptive Market Hypothesis (AMH) to Islamic holidays and political regimes. The authors (Shahid and Sattar) found that returns from stock markets vary across Islamic holidays and different political regimes (military and civilian), demonstrating that financial markets exhibit adaptive behavior and supporting the AMH. Shahid also investigated the behavior of returns from commodities, precious metals, and energy under the umbrella of AMH and different prevailing COVID-19 conditions, and found certain COVID-19 conditions proved more conducive to the performance of returns from commodities (agriculture), precious metals, and energy, supporting the AMH.

=== Evolution of Bitcoin ===
In 2018, researchers from the Indian Institute of Technology (ISM Dhanbad) published the study on the topic of the evaluation of the adaptive market hypothesis in the Bitcoin market. The authors argue that the efficient market hypothesis cannot explain why market efficiency varies, therefore it can be useful to use the adaptive market hypothesis framework to assess the evolution of bitcoin that is institutionally and operationally heterogeneous.

The paper first examines the hypothesis for the case. Secondly, it implements the Dominguez–Lobato consistent test and generalized spectral test in a rolling window framework to capture evolving linear and nonlinear dependence in bitcoin prices.

The study finds that linear and nonlinear dependence evolves with time. However, their findings contradict the Brauneis and Mestel (2018) study on this topic, which concluded that the market is either efficient or inefficient. So it follows that the evidence of dynamic efficiency adheres to the proposition of the adaptive market hypothesis.

== See also ==
- Adaptive expectations
- Adaptive Investment Approach
- Agent-based computational economics
- Behavioral economics
- Behavioral Strategy
- Financial economics § Challenges and criticism
- Information cascade
- Noisy market hypothesis
- Random walk hypothesis § A non-random walk hypothesis
