= Erica P. John Fund, Inc. v. Halliburton Co. =

- Supreme Court of the United States

Argued April 25, 2011 Decided June 6, 2011
- Full case name: Erica P. John Fund, Inc., fka Archdiocese of Milwaukee Supporting Fund, Inc., Petitioner v. Halliburton Co., et al.
- Docket no.: 09-1403
- Citations: 563 U.S. 804 (more) 131 S. Ct. 2179; 180 L. Ed. 2d 24
- Argument: Oral argument
- Opinion announcement: Opinion announcement

Holding
- Securities fraud plaintiffs need not prove loss causation in order to obtain class certification.

Court membership
- Chief Justice John Roberts Associate Justices Antonin Scalia · Anthony Kennedy; Clarence Thomas · Ruth Bader Ginsburg; Stephen Breyer · Samuel Alito; Sonia Sotomayor · Elena Kagan

Case opinion
- Majority: Roberts, joined by unanimous

Erica P. John Fund, Inc. v. Halliburton Co., 563 U.S. 804 (2011), was a United States Supreme Court case in which the Court held that "securities fraud plaintiffs need not prove loss causation in order to obtain class certification." Their decision cleared the way for class action to proceed against Halliburton over its alleged misrepresentation of facts material to the value of its stock price.

== Aftermath ==
On remand, the United States District Court for the Northern District of Texas held that Halliburton had discharged its burden of proof that alleged corrective disclosures had not resulted in any price impact for five, but not a sixth, corrective disclosure. Accordingly, a class action has been certified for the last instance.

The Court now allows defendants "to present evidence before a class is certified showing that the alleged fraud had no effect on the price" movements." Securities class action litigation will face additional hurdles and may be curbed, but not eliminated as result. with further restriction of law being dependent on the United States Congress.

A further attempt by Halliburton to defeat class action was taken at the Court of Appeal in April 2013, and once again defeated. Undeterred Halliburton again petitioned the Supreme Court to reconsider this position. At stake was "one of the fundamental tenets of securities fraud litigation: a doctrine known as fraud on the market." If this theory were unavailable, issues of individual shareholders' reliance would overshadow the common issues, and the class would not be eligible for certification under Rule 23 of the Federal Rules of Civil Procedure.

On June 23, 2014, the Supreme Court affirmed the reasoning of Basic Inc. v. Levinson, saying that it was not espousing any particular theory of markets, only the presumption that false statements can affect the price:

The academic debates discussed by Halliburton have not refuted the modest premise underlying the presumption of reliance. Even the foremost critics of the efficient-capital-markets hypothesis acknowledge that public information generally affects stock prices. Halliburton also conceded as much in its reply brief and at oral argument. Debates about the precise degree to which stock prices accurately reflect public information are thus largely beside the point. "That the . . . price [of a stock] may be inaccurate does not detract from the fact that false statements affect it, and cause loss," which is "all that Basic requires." Even though the efficient capital markets hypothesis may have "garnered substantial criticism since Basic," Halliburton has not identified the kind of fundamental shift in economic theory that could justify overruling a precedent on the ground that it misunderstood, or has since been overtaken by, economic realities.

Halliburton, in the subsequent case Halliburton, Co. v. Erika P. John or Halliburton ll, later tried to argue that a defendant in a securities fraud class action could introduce evidence of a lack of price impact at the class certification stage to show the absence of predominance.

== See also ==
- List of United States Supreme Court cases, volume 563
