= Behavioral strategy =

Behavioral strategy is an interdisciplinary field within strategic management that integrates insights from cognitive, social, and organizational psychology to better understand how individuals and groups make strategic decisions. It challenges the assumptions of traditional economic models that presume perfect rationality, instead emphasizing how real-world decision-making is shaped by cognitive biases, emotions, social dynamics, and bounded rationality.

Emerging in response to the limitations of purely rational models of strategy, behavioral strategy seeks to incorporate psychologically realistic assumptions into both the theory and practice of strategic management. It applies behavioral perspectives to core strategic topics such as CEO and top management team behavior, market entry decisions, competitive dynamics, and organizational change. It is typically characterized by the following features:

- It is microfoundational, drawing on individual-level psychological processes to explain firm-level outcomes;
- It draws broadly from psychological subfields—including cognitive, social, and organizational psychology—as well as from behavioral economics and sociology;
- It emphasizes empirically grounded assumptions, relying on evidence from laboratory and field experiments rather than abstract models or mathematical tractability.

Methodologically, behavioral strategy embraces pluralism, employing qualitative research, experiments, surveys, agent-based modeling, and traditional formal and statistical methods. Common research topics include cognitive bias in strategic decisions, the use of heuristics in uncertainty, bounded rationality in competitive interactions, and the influence of organizational culture on strategic behavior.

== Historical foundations ==
=== Early contributions ===
Herbert Simon's research on cognitive decision making and the concept of bounded rationality contributed to early developments in behavioral strategy. Simon identified four categorical observations on variations in ability to solve complex problems and make decisions:

1. Problem representation is crucial to problem solving. Effective problem solvers accurately represent problems, highlighting their nature and utilizing the most pertinent information for solutions.
2. Pattern recognition facilitates problem solving. When analyzing problems and solutions, patterns emerge that translate to 'if/then' solutions. For example, Porter's Five Forces model exemplifies 'if/then' patterns that connect strategic problems with effective solutions. For example, "if your supplier has high bargaining power, then seek alternative sources".
3. Patterns enhance memory encoding and recall. A connection to a memory allows faster recall from long-term memory, and patterns increase this connection making memories easier to recall.
4. Practice builds expertise. Repeatedly engaging in decision making and problem solving correlates with increased skill. Using representation, recognizing patterns, and recalling these patterns enhances one's abilities.

These observations provided foundational support for the development of behavioral strategy research.

=== Evolution and development ===
The application of psychological insights to research on firm behavior and performance has a rich history. This includes research on the behavioral theory of the firm (Cyert & March, 1963; Gavetti, Levinthal, and Ocasio, 2007), aspirations (Greve, 1998), attention (Ocasio, 1997), emotions (Nickerson & Zenger, 2008), goals (Lindenberg & Foss, 2011), cognitive schema, maps, sensemaking, and cognitive rivalry (Porac and Thomas, 1990; Reger and Huff, 1993; Lant and Baum, 1995; Weick, 1995), routines (Cyert & March, 1963), decision theory (Kahneman and Lovallo, 1993), escalation (Staw and Cummings, 1981), motivation (Foss & Weber, 2016), hubris (Bollaert and Petit, 2010), top management teams (Hambrick and Mason, 1984), dominant logic (Prahalad & Bettis, 1986), competitive interaction (Chen, Smith & Grimm, 1992), and organizational learning (Levinthal and March, 1993).

However, the first explicit use of the term "behavioral strategy" in a journal appears to be in Lovallo and Sibony (2010), which links the concept to behavioral economics literature and the underlying heuristics and biases research. While this was published in a practitioner journal, Powell, Lovallo, and Fox (2011) later edited a special issue on "Psychological Foundations of Strategic Management" in the Strategic Management Journal. Retrospectively, this may be seen as the key event in launching behavioral strategy as a coherent, institutionalized research effort rather than a multitude of relatively unconnected research streams.

In their editorial essay, Powell et al. outlined three reasons why there was a need for a concerted research effort in behavioral strategy:

1. Strategy research had been slow to incorporate relevant results from psychology
2. The field lacked adequate psychological grounding (e.g., firm heterogeneity was assumed rather than explained through reasoning and decision-making processes)
3. Recent developments (such as advances in cognitive neuroscience linking strategic decision-making and brain activity) had created opportunities for closer integration of cognitive sciences and strategy research

The following year, Rindova, Reger, and Dalpiaz (2012) referred to a "'sociocognitive' perspective" in strategy which, "while varied in its theoretical framings, focuses on the roles of managers' and observers' attention; the bounded rationality of their cognitions, intuitions, and emotions; and the use of biases and heuristics to socially construct 'perceptual answers' to traditional strategic management questions about how firms obtain and sustain competitive advantage."

=== Defining the field ===
The growing interest in behavioral strategy has prompted several attempts to define the field (Powell et al., 2011; Rindova et al., 2012; Hambrick and Crossland, 2019) and surveys of closely related theoretical approaches, such as the behavioral theory of the firm (Gavetti, Levinthal, Greve, & Ocasio, 2012) and problemistic search (Posen et al., 2018). Hambrick and Crossland (2019) proposed conceptualizing behavioral strategy using an imagery of differently sized "tents":

- Small tent: "A direct transposition of the logic of behavioral economics (and behavioral finance) to the field of strategic management"
- Medium tent: "A commitment to understanding the psychology of strategists"
- Large tent: "All forms and styles of research that consider any psychological, social, or political ingredients in strategic management"

Today, behavioral strategy has evolved into a significant subfield within strategic management. It applies insights from social psychology and cognitive science to enhance strategic decision-making by deepening understanding of social dynamics and human cognition. The field places particular emphasis on top managers' cognitive processes and the patterns of collaboration and communication within organizations, with its foundation in behavioral decision theory. Strategic cognition, a key component of behavioral strategy, focuses on understanding cognitive structures within organizations and their decision-making processes. Both effective analytical reasoning and intuition play significant roles in strategy formulation, influencing organizational and managerial cognition. The field has gained substantial attention in academic circles, with dedicated issues and volumes in prestigious conferences and publications. Despite this growth, behavioral strategy remains somewhat fragmented. To address this challenge, scholars have proposed integrating theoretical and empirical approaches to provide a more comprehensive understanding of how behavior impacts strategic outcomes.

== Application in COVID-19 ==
Behavioral strategy affected decisions made during the COVID-19 disruption. Behavioral strategy provides psychologically based interpretations that can illuminate how individuals and organizations respond to such disruptions. It suggests that strategists may not be good at using formal models, rules, or forecasts because they are not statisticians. There is supporting evidence of this observed during the disruption caused by COVID

-19. Some decision-makers treated extreme model projections as deterministic predictions rather than recognizing them as improbable worst-case scenarios. An example of this was the societal lockdown. It was impossible to forecast the economic and social consequences of the lockdown, and its effectiveness, and yet decision-makers decided to implement this worst-case scenario. Another example of worst-case scenario being implemented is when the CDC gave guidance on wearing masks outdoors as this was an example of extreme caution. Decision-makers appeared to overlook the consequences of or misunderstand the lack of error margins around initial forecasts. Also of relevance, decision-makers may rely too much on models, forecasts, and data that are available. When decision-making problems are ill-structured and require quick action, relying solely on formal models and forecasts can be problematic. It becomes necessary to incorporate intuition and soft data into the decision-making process in these cases.

== Limitations of behavioral strategy ==
Strategy making is a deeply social process and strategy research doesn't sufficiently account for this. Different experts' social standards vary, and this will influence what information is collected. COVID-19 highlighted how behavioral strategy frameworks don’t allow dealing with uncertainty beyond standard treatments of risky decision-making. Behavioral strategy is useful in extreme circumstances, however, there is more research to be done on the weaknesses present for disruptions like this.

== See also ==
- Adaptive market hypothesis – Economic theory
- Behavioral operations management
- Economic sociology – Branch of sociology
- Market sentiment – General attitude of investors to market price development
- Socioeconomics – Branch of sociology
