= Civil procedure code of Austria =

Zivilprozessordnung (ZPO) is the Austrian code of civil procedure. It was drafted in 1895 by Franz Klein, and superseded the Josephinian Common Court Regulations (Allgemeine Gerichtsordnung (AGO)) of 1781.

== Principles ==
The Austrian litigious proceedings (Streitiges Verfahren) are governed by the following principles:

- Orality and publicity (Grundsatz der Mündlichkeit und der Öffentlichkeit): The proceedings are oral and public.
- Fair procedure (Grundsatz des beiderseitigen rechtlichen Gehörs): audiatur et altera pars.
- Adversarial system (Dispositionsgrundsatz): The parties determine the commencement and subject of action.
- Ex officio proceedings (Grundsatz des Amtsbetriebs): The conduct of legal proceedings and the service of process rests with the court.
- Cooperative principle (Kooperationsgrundsatz): The parties and the court cooperate by making factual claims, presenting evidence, and by exercising actions of procedural authority.
- Immediacy principle (Unmittelbarkeitsgrundsatz): Only the judge before whom litigation takes place may take evidence and decide.
- Free consideration of evidence (freie Beweiswürdigung): The judge decides freely on which facts he considers proven.
- Procedural economy (Prozessökonomie): Principles governing a speedy and focused procedure.
  - Freedom of assertion (Freiheit des Vorbringens): The parties are free to present facts and evidence and to file motions until the end of the oral proceedings.
  - Duty to bring matters to court in good time (Prozessförderungspflicht): The parties are obliged to present their pleadings timely and completely, in order for the proceedings to proceed quickly.
  - Interdiction of novation (Neuerungsverbot): The presentation of evidence and the making of factual claims are restricted to first instance proceedings.
