= Civil procedure code of Germany =

Zivilprozessordnung (ZPO) is the German code of civil procedure. It was enacted in 1887. It strongly influenced the Code of Civil Procedure in Japan and Taiwan. It regulates the judicial procedure in civil legal disputes and came into force in its original version on October 1, 1879, as part of the Reich Justice Act. It was intended to be "practically usable and expedient" and to "lead the legal dispute to its decision in the simplest, shortest and safest way".

== See also ==
- Bürgerliches Gesetzbuch (BGB) - the German Civil Code.
