= The Reformation in Economics =

Economics book

The Reformation in Economics: A Deconstruction and Reconstruction of Economic Theory
- Author: Philip Pilkington
- Language: English
- Genre: Nonfiction
- Publisher: Palgrave Macmillan
- Publication date: 2016
- Publication place: United Kingdom
- Media type: Print, Ebook
- Pages: 358
- ISBN: 978-3-319-40756-2 (Paperback)

The Reformation in Economics is a book written by the Irish economist Philip Pilkington. It is a book that aims to deconstruct contemporary neoclassical economic theory in order to determine to what extent it is scientific and to what extent it is ideological. The book is divided into three sections: Ideology and Methodology, Stripped-Down Macroeconomics and Approaching the Real World.

== Themes ==
The author considers a lot of contemporary neoclassical economic theory to be ideology. In an article that accompanied the release of the book, Pilkington compared neoclassical economics to the 19th century ideological pseudoscience of phrenology:

"What made phrenology so popular was what also made economics so popular at the time: it gave a rationale for a society based on Progress and also provided a blueprint for how this could be achieved. The phrenological doctrine, being so vague in its pronouncements, was highly malleable and could be used to justify whatever those in power needed justifying. So, for example, in 19th century England phrenology was used to justify laissez faire economic policies by emphasising unequal natural capacities amongst the population while in early 20th century Belgian Rwanda it was used to justify the supposed superiority of the Tutsis over the Hutus. In my book The Reformation in Economics I take the position that modern economics is more similar to phrenology than it is to, say, physics."

== Reviews ==
In the Financial Times, journalist Martin Sandbu wrote that Pilkington "usefully revisits forgotten writers from the history of economic thought but insists a little too rashly that they alone were right and the entire direction the field took instead was misguided. He correctly points out the dangers of mathematising economic argument - but somewhat undermines his point by introducing equations of his own."

In the Irish Times Cillian Doyle wrote that Pilkington "dispenses with such appeals by making his pitch to the next generation, those who are currently cutting their teeth in undergraduate or postgraduate courses" and that he sees "economics as ripe for the kind of transformation experienced by religion half a millennia ago and with the same irreverence that Martin Luther once besieged the Church". Doyle writes that Pilkington has provided a basis on which the student movements protesting the current curriculum can build.

In the journal American Affairs, economist Marc Morgan writes that the book "is a deeply informed, lucid, and concise critique of the edifice and history of the current dominant economics paradigm—what the author refers to as “marginalist economics”—coupled with a foundational reconstruction from first principles, “a firm grounding, a shrub that can, given time, grow into something far more robust.” It is a bold task, but one the author largely accomplishes with great precision, and more importantly, pedagogy. Its depth comes from its excursions into other fields of epistemological inquiry."
