= Collective redress =

Collective redress is a legal term used within the European Union to define a legal instrument for group proceedings similar to the US concept of a class action. Collective redress is embodied in Directive (EU) 2020/1828, the Directive on representative actions for the protection of the collective interests of consumers.

== Background ==
A survey carried out by the European Commission found that more than 79% of EU consumers would exercise their rights with other claimants in the event of joint proceedings. The possibility of group action would enable inexpensive legal action and would also act as deterrent. The Commission declared that it would not copy the US system, would avoid abusive and excessive practices and would take account of the 27 legal systems of member states which have developed over time. The instrument of class action does not confer any new rights or create new claims but only provides new ways of asserting them. Some European states already have proceedings which are similar to class action; others have introduced compromises, such as legal action taken by associations, although most EU member states do not have any such instruments.

The Commission's attempts to enact a European collective redress scheme were stalled for many years. Like a significant number of American lawyers, many European lawyers have traditionally regarded the American class action as a form of judicially endorsed extortion. The Directive was finally enacted in the aftermath of the 2015 Volkswagen emissions scandal, in which it became painfully clear that existing civil procedure laws were unable to deliver justice to consumers across Europe in a swift or cost-efficient manner. While European courts were jammed for several years with consumers forced to relitigate the same issues in every case on an individual basis, American consumers were able to extract an US$11.2 billion class action settlement from Volkswagen after only about one-and-a-half years of litigation.
