= Commencement of action =

Commencement of action is the formal procedure by which legal proceedings are initiated. Commencement of civil lawsuits begins when the plaintiff files the complaint with the court. Criminal proceedings are typically commenced by a government prosecutor. In many U.S. jurisdictions, depending on the rules, prosecutors may have the option to commence a criminal action by filing the petition directly with the court or by seeking an indictment from a grand jury.

== See also ==
- Petition
- Cause of action
- Federal Rules of Civil Procedure
- Federal Rules of Criminal Procedure
- Comminatory
