= Franz Klein (politician) =

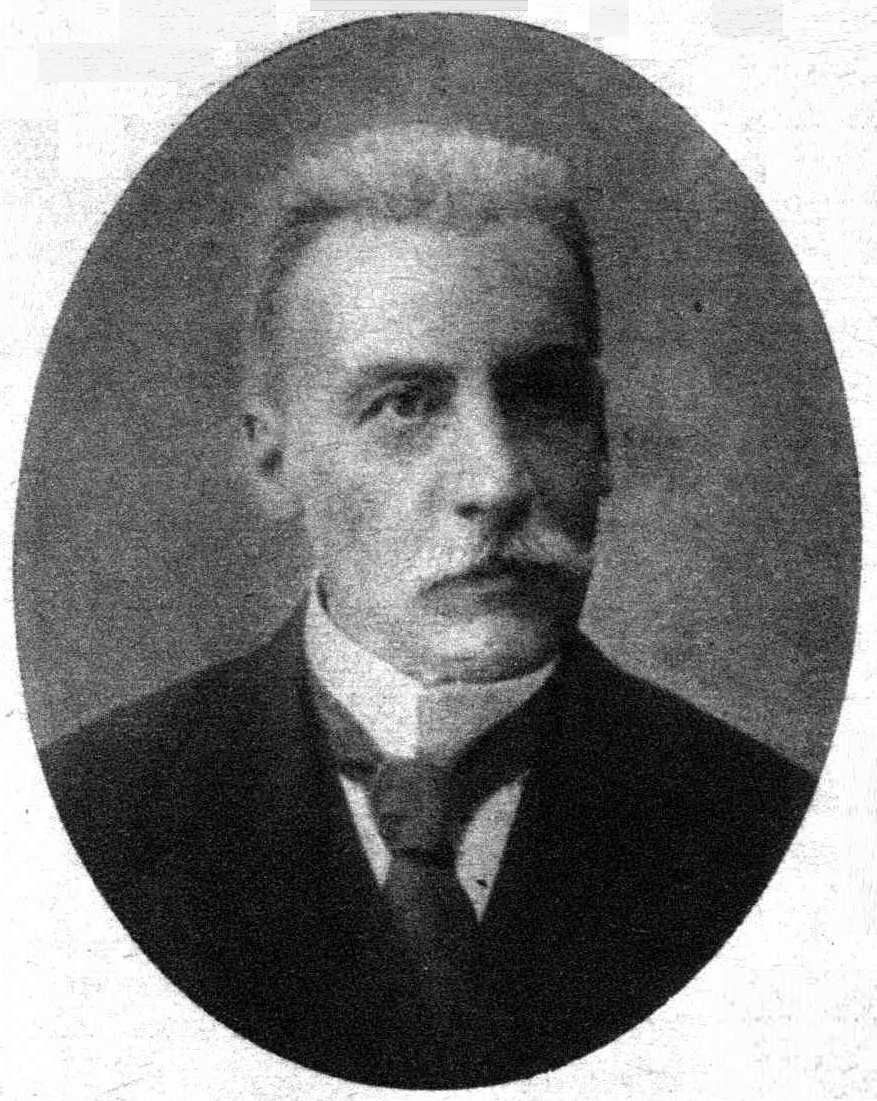
- Franz Klein (1919)

Minister of Justice of Austria-Hungary
- In office 1906–1908

Minister of Justice of Austria-Hungary
- In office November 1916 – December 1916

Personal details
- Born: 24 April 1854 Vienna, Austria
- Died: 6 April 1926 (aged 71)
- Education: University of Vienna
- Occupation: Jurist, politician

Franz Klein (24 April 1854 – 6 April 1926) was an Austrian jurist and politician, who served as Minister of Justice towards the end of the Austro-Hungarian Empire.

Born in Vienna, Klein studied and later taught law there, achieving habilitation in the law of civil procedure and Roman law in 1891. His essay Pro Futuro, in which he called for civil procedure reform, led to his appointment as an official with the Ministry of Justice, where he drafted the Austrian code of civil procedure, among several other laws. He helped strengthen the investigative authority and responsibility of the judge to the benefit of the weaker party, moving civil procedure towards a more inquisitorial system.

In 1905, Klein was appointed to the House of Lords. He served as Minister of Justice between 1906 and 1908, and again from November to December in 1916. He was a member of the Austrian observer delegation to the negotiations about the 1919 treaty of Saint-Germain-en-Laye. After the fall of the monarchy, he failed to gain reelection to Parliament.
