= Jules Regnault =

French stock broker's assistant

Jules Augustin Frédéric Regnault (French: [ʁəɲo]; 1 February 1834, Béthencourt – 9 December 1894, Paris) was a French stock broker's assistant who first suggested a modern theory of stock price changes in Calcul des Chances et Philosophie de la Bourse (1863), using a random walk model. A key conclusion appears on Page 50: "l'écart des cours est en raison directe de la racine carrée des temps", in English: "the deviation of prices is directly proportional to the square root of time". He is also one of the first authors who tried to create a "stock exchange science" based on statistical and probabilistic analysis. His hypotheses were used by Louis Bachelier.

== Biography ==
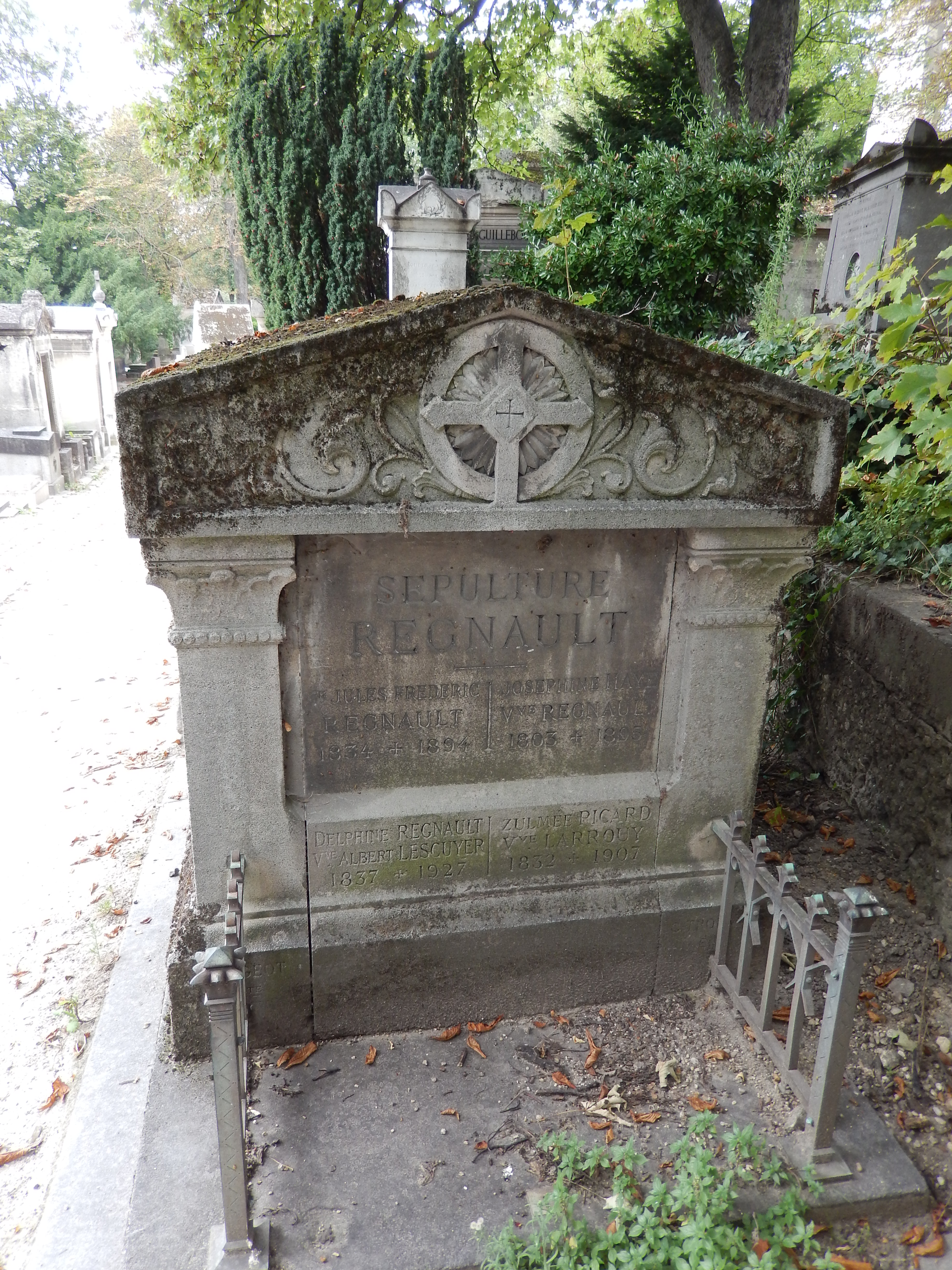
Grave of Jules Regnault in the Père Lachaise Cemetery, Paris

During the first years of his life, Jules Regnault lived in the département du Nord (France) where his father worked. When his father died on 16 January 1846 in Paris, his family moved to Brussels, where Odilon, Jules’ brother, became a writer and a student at the Université libre de Bruxelles in advanced mathematics. Jules’ family was not rich, and consequently, Odilon was exempted from serving in the military service and from paying his University registration. At the beginning of the 1860s, the two brothers moved to Paris and became brokers. In all likelihood, when Jules and Odilon arrived in Paris, their financial resources were limited, forcing them to live in one (or two) garret room(s), for which no tax had to be paid. However, Jules Regnault became a millionaire later in life.

In 1881, he stopped being a broker and became a rentier. He died on 9 December 1894. At the time of death, his fortune was estimated at 1,026,510.03 francs (that is more than 3.8 million euros 2004). The inventory of Regnault's goods shows that the most important part of his fortune was invested in bonds (around 706,500 francs, that is around 70% of his fortune), primarily in the French 3.5% rente (166,216.80 francs), and in shares (around 104,565 francs, that is about 10%). This inventory suggests that he applied financial theory to establish his fortune. According to his Calcul des chances et philosophie de la bourse, the only valid investment should be bonds, which is precisely what his inventory shows.

== Common mistake ==
There is a mistake in the Grand dictionnaire universel du XIXe siècle published by Pierre Larousse. In the Jules Regnault bibliographical note, he wrote “Regnault (Jules), French learned, dead in 1866”. This note attributes several books to Jules. However, with the exception of the Calcul des chances et philosophie de la bourse, all the other books were written by Jean-Joseph Regnault (1797-1863) who signed some of his books “J. Regnault”. This signature can explain the mistake. However, these two authors have no family relationship. The Catalogue général de la librairie française published in 1871 made the same mistake.

== See also ==
- Econometrics
- Louis Bachelier
- Vinzenz Bronzin
