= Fraud on the market =

Theory regarding stock prices

The fraud-on-the-market theory is the idea that stock prices are a function of all material information about the company and its business. It applies to securities markets, where it can be assumed that all material information is available to investors. The theory states that under these conditions, there is a causal link between any misstatement and any stock purchaser, because the misstatements defraud the entire market and thus affect the price of the stock. Therefore, a material misstatement's effect on an individual purchaser is no less significant than the effect on the entire market.

According to this theory, "When an investor buys or sells stock at the market price, his or her reliance may be presumed, assuming that he or she pleads that: (1) the information allegedly misrepresented was publicly known, (2) it was material, (3) the stock was traded in an efficient market, and (4) the plaintiff traded in the stock in the relevant period."

Fraud on the market theory applies to civil enforcement of SEC Rule 10b-5 which "prohibits any act or omission resulting in fraud or deceit in connection with the purchase or sale of any security". The use of this theory was established in Basic and affirmed in Halliburton.

== See also ==
- Efficient-market hypothesis
