= Stephen C. Yeazell =

Stephen C. Yeazell is a David G. Price and Dallas P. Price Distinguished Professor of Law Emeritus at the UCLA School of Law (since 1975). written several books, including From Medieval Group Litigation to the Modern Class Action, Contemporary Civil Litigation, Federal Rules of Civil Procedure; With Selected Statutes and Cases, and Civil Procedure.

== Early life and education ==
Stephen C. Yeazell received his Bachelor of Arts from Swarthmore College in 1967 and his Master of Arts in English and comparative literature from Columbia University in 1968, which led him to teach English and history in junior high schools in New York City. He then finished his academics at Harvard Law School, where he completed his J.D. in 1974. After law school, he clerked for Justice Mathew Tobriner of the California Supreme Court.

== Books ==
- Lawsuits in a Market Economy: The Evolution of Civil Litigation, University of Chicago Press, 2018
