= Basic Inc. v. Levinson =

- Supreme Court of the United States

Argued November 2, 1987 Decided March 7, 1988
- Full case name: Basic Incorporated, et al., Petitioners v. Max L. Levinson et al.
- Citations: 485 U.S. 224 (more) 108 S. Ct. 978; 99 L. Ed. 2d 194; 1988 U.S. LEXIS 1197; 56 U.S.L.W. 4232; Fed. Sec. L. Rep. (CCH) ¶ 93,645; 24 Fed. R. Evid. Serv. (Callaghan) 961; 10 Fed. R. Serv. 3d (Callaghan) 308

Case history
- Prior: Class certified, granted summary judgment to defendants, Levinson v. Basic Inc., No. C79-1220, 1984 WL 1152 (N.D. Ohio Aug. 3, 1984), reversed, 786 F.2d 741 (6th Cir. 1986); cert. granted, 479 U.S. 1083 (1987).

Holding
- Plaintiffs are entitled to a rebuttable presumption of reliance in a 10b-5 case, based on a fraud-on-the-market theory.

Court membership
- Chief Justice William Rehnquist Associate Justices William J. Brennan Jr. · Byron White; Thurgood Marshall · Harry Blackmun; John P. Stevens · Sandra Day O'Connor; Antonin Scalia · Anthony Kennedy

Case opinions
- Majority: Blackmun, joined by Brennan, Marshall, Stevens; White, O'Connor (parts I, II, III)
- Concur/dissent: White, joined by O'Connor
- Rehnquist, Scalia, and Kennedy took no part in the consideration or decision of the case.

Laws applied
- Securities Exchange Act of 1934, SEC Rule 10b-5

Basic Inc. v. Levinson, 485 U.S. 224 (1988), was a case in which the Supreme Court of the United States articulated the "fraud-on-the-market theory" as giving rise to a rebuttable presumption of reliance in securities fraud cases.

== Background ==
Combustion Engineering, Inc. sought to acquire Basic, Inc., and had engaged in discussions with Basic's officers and directors. Three months after these discussions began, Basic asked the New York Stock Exchange to suspend trading in its shares and issued a release stating that it had been "approached" by another company concerning a merger. Basic president Max Muller publicly denied Basic's involvement in any merger discussions. The next day, Basic's board approved Combustion's tender offer for all outstanding shares.

Plaintiff Max L. Levinson was a Basic shareholder who brought a class action suit against Basic and its directors, alleging that he and other shareholders were injured by selling Basic shares at artificially depressed prices in a market affected by—and relying on—Basic's misleading statements. Plaintiffs alleged that Basic's misrepresentations violated § 10(b) of the Securities Exchange Act of 1934 and SEC Rule 10b-5.

The United States District Court for the Northern District of Ohio certified the class, finding that plaintiffs were entitled to a presumption of reliance on Basic's public statements, and therefore that common questions of fact or law predominated over particular questions pertaining to individual plaintiffs. However, on the merits the court granted Basic's motion for summary judgment, finding the statements to be immaterial.

The United States Court of Appeals for the Sixth Circuit affirmed class certification, joining a number of other circuits in accepting the fraud-on-the-market theory. The Court of Appeals also reversed and remanded the decision on summary judgment, holding that although Basic did not have an affirmative duty to disclose the merger discussions, it could not release misleading statements. The U.S. Supreme Court then granted certiorari to resolve a circuit split on the materiality issue and determine the propriety of the fraud-on-the-market theory.

== Opinion of the Court ==
Justice Blackmun, writing for the majority, first examined the underlying policy behind the Securities Exchange Act: to protect investors against manipulation of stock prices. The Securities and Exchange Commission promulgated Rule 10b-5 to prevent fraud and enforce the Act's requirements.

=== Materiality of preliminary merger discussions ===
Blackmun reviewed the standards of materiality, including the holding in TSC Industries, Inc. v. Northway, Inc., that "an omitted fact is material if there is a substantial likelihood that a reasonable shareholder would consider it important in deciding how to vote." This standard was then expressly adopted for § 10(b) and Rule 10b-5.

The Court re-iterated that where there is a duty to disclose, management must disclose or abstain from trading. Where there is no duty to disclose, the Court will not question the timing of disclosure. But if management is under no duty to disclose and misrepresents a material fact, management may be held accountable. In other words, the Court was not concerned about the timing of disclosure, only its accuracy and completeness. The Court then went on to establish a standard for determining the materiality of merger discussions.

Blackmun reviewed and rejected the Third Circuit test that merger discussions become material only when an agreement in principle has been reached, finding that standard too "rigid" and "artificial." Blackmun also rejected the Sixth Circuit test, which held that publicly denying the existence of merger discussions makes those discussions material by virtue of denying their existence. He reasoned that it is not enough for a statement to be untrue if it is insignificant. Blackmun declined to adopt a test that hinged on a single event, holding instead that the materiality of merger discussions is always a function of the probability of the completion of the merger and the magnitude of the transaction.

=== Reliance and the fraud-on-the-market theory ===
The fraud-on-the-market theory is the idea that stock prices are a function of all material information about the company and its business. It applies in open and developed securities markets, where it can be assumed that all material information is available to investors. The theory states that under these conditions, there is a causal link between any misstatement and any stock purchaser, because the misstatements defraud the entire market and thus affect the price of the stock. Therefore, a material misstatement's effect on an individual purchaser is no less significant than the effect on the entire market. The question before the court was whether this entitles an individual stock purchaser a presumption of reliance, even if the purchaser did not directly rely on the misstatements.

Observing that the reality of modern securities markets is such that face-to-face transactions are rare, Justice Blackmun noted that requiring a showing of actual reliance would effectively prevent plaintiffs from ever proceeding as a class action. Also finding that investors often rely on market price, he found the rebuttable presumption of reliance (through the fraud-on-the-market theory) to be a reasonable compromise between the requirements of Federal Rules of Civil Procedure 23 and the securities fraud element of reliance. Blackmun further noted that both Congress's intent and recent empirical studies reflect the idea that open markets incorporate all material information into share price.

The Court thereby adopted a rebuttable presumption of reliance, based on the fraud-on-the-market theory. Blackmun noted that defendants could rebut the presumption by showing that there was no link between the misstatements and plaintiff's price paid or received.

The Court further noted that, should a corporation wish to maintain the confidentiality of its merger talks without denying the chance of a merger, its directors need only state that they had "no comment" regarding any potential merger.

Blackmun vacated the decision of the Court of Appeals and remanded the case.
