= Alex Edmans =

British economist

- Occupation: Economist

Academic background
- Education: Professor
- Alma mater: Merton College, Oxford & MIT Sloan School of Management

Academic work
- Institutions: London Business School & Gresham College

Alex Edmans FBA FAcSS is a British academic and economist who is professor of finance at London Business School and Mercers' School Memorial Emeritus Professor of Business at Gresham College. He serves on the World Economic Forum Global Future Council on the Future of Responsible Investing and as a non-executive director of the Investor Forum. He is a Fellow of the British Academy, the Academy of Social Sciences and the Financial Management Association (FMA), Director of the American Finance Association, and Vice President of the Western Finance Association. He is the Vice President-Program of the FMA for 2026.

In 2021, Edmans was named Professor of the Year by Poets&Quants. From 2017 to 2022 he served as managing editor of the Review of Finance, increasing its impact factor from below 2 to above 5.

Edmans' book on the business case for purpose, Grow the Pie: How Great Companies Deliver Both Purpose and Profit, was named to the Financial Times best books of 2020. He is co-author (with Richard Brealey, Stewart Myers, and Franklin Allen) of Principles of Corporate Finance, a leading corporate finance textbook. He gave the TED talk What to Trust in a Post-Truth World, on confirmation bias and the importance of being discerning with evidence, which has 2 million views.

== Education and early career ==
Edmans studied at St. Paul's School, London and then received a BA in Economics and Management from Merton College, Oxford. After two years at Morgan Stanley, he earned a PhD in Financial Economics from MIT Sloan School of Management as a Fulbright scholar. His first academic position was at Wharton School of the University of Pennsylvania. He was awarded tenure in 2013 and then moved to London Business School as a full professor of finance.

== Research ==
Edmans' research is on corporate governance, executive pay, the real effects of financial markets, and behavioral finance, and has been cited over 20,000 times. His work covers topics such as the role of blockholders (large shareholders) in disciplining management, the importance of long horizons in executive pay, how managers learn from financial markets to guide their real decisions, and the effect of sentiment on the stock market.

=== Responsible business ===
Edmans’ main strand of research is on the business case for responsible business, demonstrating that responsibility can create financial as well as social value. His papers in the Journal of Financial Economics and Academy of Management Perspectives show that companies with high employee satisfaction, as measured by their inclusion in the 100 Best Companies to Work For in America, delivered shareholder returns that beat their peers by 2.3-3.8% per year over a 28-year period. His book, Grow the Pie, argues that investing in stakeholders does not split the pie at the expense of shareholders, but grows the pie for the ultimate benefit of shareholders.

His most recent work highlights the trade-offs and complexities involved in responsible business. He finds that demographic diversity statistics bear little relation to diversity, equity, and inclusion, and that the high returns to carbon-emitting stocks arise due to higher profits rather than greater risk. His paper The End of ESG called for the ESG term to be scrapped on the grounds that environmental, social, and governance issues are relevant to all practitioners, not just ESG practitioners. It argues that ESG is "extremely important and nothing special", the former because it is critical to long-term value and the latter because it should not be seen as superior to other drivers of long-term value.

== Books ==
- Grow the Pie: How Great Companies Deliver Both Purpose and Profit, Cambridge University Press, 2020
- Principles of Corporate Finance, 14th edition, McGraw-Hill, 2022
- May Contain Lies: How Stories, Statistics and Studies Exploit Our Biases - And What We Can Do About It, Penguin Random House, 2024
- The Madness of Markets: Why Smart Investors Make Crazy Decisions - And How to Exploit Them, Penguin Random House, 2026
