= Leveraged recapitalization =

Change of a company's capital structure

In corporate finance, a leveraged recapitalization is a change of the company's capital structure, usually substitution of debt for equity.

== Overview ==
Such recapitalizations are executed via issuing bonds to raise money and using the proceeds to buy the company's stock or to pay dividends. Such a maneuver is called a leveraged buyout when initiated by an outside party, or a leveraged recapitalization when initiated by the company itself for internal reasons. These types of recapitalization can be minor adjustments to the capital structure of the company, or can be large changes involving a change in the power structure as well.

Leveraged recapitalizations are used by privately held companies as a means of refinancing, generally to provide cash to the shareholders while not requiring a total sale of the company. Debt (in the form of bonds) has some advantages over equity as a way of raising money, since it can have tax benefits and can enforce a cash discipline. The reduction in equity also makes the firm less vulnerable to a hostile takeover.

Leveraged recapitalizations can be used by public companies to increase earnings per share. The Capital structure substitution theory shows this only works for public companies that have an earnings yield that is smaller than their after-tax interest rate on corporate bonds, and that operate in markets that allow share repurchases.

There are downsides, however. This form of recapitalization can lead a company to focus on short-term projects that generate cash (to pay off the debt and interest payments), which in turn leads the company to lose its strategic focus. Also, if a firm cannot make its debt payments, meet its loan covenants or rollover its debt it enters financial distress which often leads to bankruptcy. Therefore, the additional debt burden of a leveraged recapitalization makes a firm more vulnerable to unexpected business problems including recessions and financial crises.

== See also ==
- Capital structure substitution theory
- Leveraged buyout
- Dividend recapitalization
