= Closed-end fund =

Professionally managed investment fund

A closed-end fund (CEF), also known as a closed-end mutual fund, is an investment vehicle fund that raises capital by issuing a fixed number of shares at its inception, and then invests that capital in financial assets such as stocks and bonds. After inception it is closed to new capital, although fund managers sometimes employ leverage. Investors can buy and sell the existing shares in secondary markets.

CEFs are the oldest form of pooled investment still used, dating to the 1800s. The Foreign and Colonial Investment Trust was established in the United Kingdom in 1868 and as of 2013 was the oldest CEF still active and traded on the market (London Stock Exchange, under the symbol FCIT). In the United States, closed-end funds sold publicly must be registered under both the Securities Act of 1933 and the Investment Company Act of 1940.

U.S.-based closed-end funds are referred to under the law as closed-end companies and form one of three SEC-recognized types of investment companies along with mutual funds and unit investment trusts.

Like their better-known open-ended cousins, closed-end funds are usually sponsored by a fund management company. The fund's charter, prospectus and the applicable government regulations specify the types of investments the fund manager is permitted to buy. Some funds invest in stocks, others in bonds, and some in very specific assets (for instance, tax-exempt bonds issued by the state of Florida in the USA).

== Distinguishing features ==
A closed-end fund differs from an open-end mutual fund in that:

- Closed-end fund shares are traded on stock exchanges, and can be purchased and sold through brokers at any time during market hours. An open-end fund can usually be traded only by transacting directly with the investment company that manages the fund, at a time of day specified by the investment company, and the dealing price will usually not be known in advance as the fund buys and sells at net asset value for the day's end.
- A closed-end fund usually trades at a premium or discount to the market value of its assets (known as net asset value, or NAV). In contrast, the price of an open-end fund cannot fall below net asset value, because the funds are required to transact with investors only at net asset value.
- Closed-end fund investors who wish to exit the investment can do so only by selling the funds' shares to other investors on stock exchanges. In contrast, open-end funds are redeemed directly by the fund at net asset value.
- In the United States, a closed-end company can own unlisted securities.

Another distinguishing feature of a closed-end fund is the common use of leverage (gearing) to obtain new money to invest after the fund's inception. This can be done by issuing preferred stock, commercial paper or rights offerings. Leverage amplifies gains when the market prices of the fund's investments rise, but it also amplifies losses when market prices decrease. This increases the volatility of a leveraged fund's net asset value, compared with an unleveraged peer.

The amount of leverage a fund uses is expressed as a percent of total fund assets (e.g. if it has a 25% leverage ratio, that means that for each $100 of total assets under management, $75 is equity and $25 is debt). In some cases, fund managers charge management fees based on the total managed assets of the fund, which includes leverage. This further reduces the income benefit of leverage to the common shareholder, while retaining the additional volatility.

Leveraged funds can seem to have higher expense ratios — a common way that investors compare funds — than their non-leveraged peers. Some investment analysts advocate that expenses attributable to the use of leverage should be considered a reduction of investment income rather than an expense, and publish adjusted ratios.

Since stock in closed-end funds is traded like other stock, an investor trading them will pay a brokerage commission similar to that paid when trading other stocks (as opposed to commissions on open-ended mutual funds, where the commission will vary based on the share class chosen and the method of purchasing the fund). In other words, closed-end funds typically do not have sales-based share classes with different commission rates and annual fees. The main exception is loan-participation funds.

== Comparison to exchange-traded funds (ETFs) ==
Closed-end funds are traded on exchanges, and in that respect they are like exchange-traded funds (ETFs), but there are important differences between these two kinds of security. The price of a closed-end fund's shares is completely determined by investor demand, and this price often diverges substantially from the NAV of the fund assets. In contrast, the market price of an ETF trades in a narrow range very close to its net asset value, because the structure of ETFs allows major market participants to redeem shares of an ETF for a "basket" of the fund's underlying assets. This feature could in theory lead to potential arbitrage profits if the market price of the ETF were to diverge substantially from its NAV. The market prices of closed-end funds are often 10% to 20% higher or lower than their NAV, while the market price of an ETF is typically within 1% of its NAV. Since the market downturn of late 2008, a number of fixed income ETFs have traded at premiums of roughly 2% to 3% above their NAV.

== Discounts and premiums ==
Closed-end fund shares often trade at prices that deviate from the market values of the securities in their portfolios. Such funds have a long history of trading at a discount to market value, although they may also trade at a premium. Reasons for the tendency towards discount pricing are thought to include:

- investor perception that the fund's management fees are too high, or that future performance will be disappointing;
- stockbrokers' reluctance to recommend closed-end funds to customers because other investments such as mutual funds generate higher sales commissions;
- concerns that closed-end fund net asset values overstate the true market value of the underlying investments, for example because the fund holds illiquid securities (such as private placements or restricted stock), or because net asset value does not reflect capital gains taxes that will be incurred when the fund sells the underlying investments;
- the practice of deducting fund expenses before dividends are distributed to investors, which makes the fund's yield lower than would be obtained by buying the identical stocks in the open market;
- the belief that closed-end funds tend to attract less astute individual investors, rather than professional or institutional investors, and that individuals tend to be "noise traders", whose expectations about future returns are too high in some periods and too low in others, or who believe they have special information that provides them with insight about future trends; and
- individual investors' tendency to sell closed-end funds near the end of the year, which causes discounts to widen near the end of the year.

However, financial economists Zvi Bodie, Alex Kane and Alan J. Marcus have opined that the various hypotheses put forth do not fully explain the persistence of discount pricing.

== Recent trends ==
The Herzfeld Closed-End Average traded at a discount to net asset value during most of calendar year 2022 and all of 2023, according to the American weekly financial newspaper Barron's. This average measures 15 equally-weighted closed-end funds based in the U.S. that invest primarily in U.S. equities.

== Examples ==
Among the largest (by assets under management), and longest-running closed end funds are:

- Adams Express Company (NYSE:ADX), 1929 inception
- Witan Investment Trust plc (LSE:WTAN), recently merged with Alliance Trust PLC to form Alliance Witan PLC
- Scottish Mortgage Investment Trust (LSE:SMT), 1909 inception
- Tri-Continental Corporation (NYSE:TY), 1929 inception
- Gabelli Equity Trust (NYSE:GAB), 1986
- General American Investors Company (NYSE:GAM), 1927 inception

== See also ==
- Collective investment schemes: for generic information.
- Investment trust: a United Kingdom closed-ended collective investment
- Mutual funds: for United States information.
- Listed investment companies: for Australia.
- Relevant articles in The Journal of Finance:
  - Managerial Ability, Compensation and the Closed-End Fund Discount. Jonathan B. Berk and Richard Stanton. April 2007.
  - Noise Trading in Small Markets. Frederic Palomino. September 1996.
  - An Investor Expectations Stock Price Predictive Model Using Closed-End Fund Premiums. Martin E. Zweig. March 1993.
  - Closed‐End Fund Shares' Abnormal Returns and the Information Content of Discounts and Premiums. Greggory A. Brauer. March 1988.
