= Market timing hypothesis =

Hypothesis that firms adjust financing decisions to exploit favourable market conditions

The market timing hypothesis, in corporate finance, is a theory of how firms and corporations decide whether to finance their investment with equity or with debt instruments. Here, equity market timing refers to "the practice of issuing shares at high prices and repurchasing at low prices, [where] the intention is to exploit temporary fluctuations in the cost of equity relative to the cost of other forms of capital".

It is one of many such corporate finance theories; it is often contrasted with the pecking order theory and the trade-off theory. It is differentiated by its emphasis on the level of the market, which is seen as the first order determinant of a corporation's capital structure: the (further) implication being that firms are generally indifferent as to whether they finance with debt or equity, choosing the form of financing, which, at that point in time, seems to be more valued by financial markets.

More generally, the Hypothesis is classified as part of the behavioral finance literature. Here, it does not attempt to explain why there would be any asset mispricing, or why firms would be better able than the than "the market" in telling that there is mispricing (see Efficient-market hypothesis). Rather, it simply assumes that mispricing exists, and describes the behavior of firms under various market and corporate outcomes. However, any theory with time varying costs and benefits is likely to generate time varying corporate issuing decisions. This is true whether decision makers are behavioral or rational.

The empirical evidence for the hypothesis is mixed. On the one hand, current capital structure appears strongly related to historical market values, suggesting that "capital structure is the cumulative outcome of past attempts to time the equity market". On the other, studiesshow that the effect of market timing disappears after as little as two years. In particular, "the impact of market timing on leverage completely vanishes", with debt issued following equity financing during earlier hot equity periods. Further, the (standard version of) the hypothesis is said to be somewhat incomplete as relates to theory. Beyond empirical study, as alluded to, a model is needed to explain why at the same moment in time, some firms issue debt while other firms issue equity.

== See also ==
- Corporate finance § Capitalization structure
- Pecking order theory
- Trade-off theory
- Modigliani–Miller theorem
- Capital structure substitution theory
- Dividend policy § Dividend signaling hypothesis
- Outline of corporate finance § Theory
