= Dividend recapitalization =

In finance, a type of leveraged recapitalization

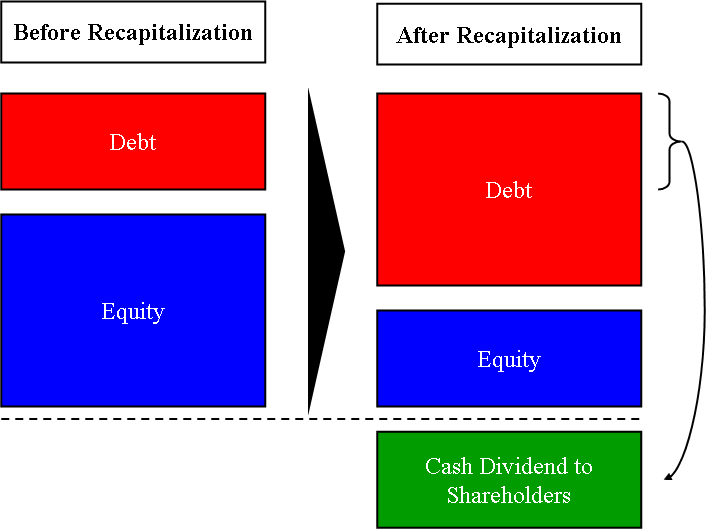
Diagram of a dividend recapitalization where debt is issued to pay a dividend to shareholders

A dividend recapitalization (often referred to as a dividend recap) in finance is a type of leveraged recapitalization in which a payment is made to shareholders. As opposed to a typical dividend which is paid regularly from the company's earnings, a dividend recapitalization occurs when a company raises debt —e.g. by issuing bonds to fund the dividend.

These types of recapitalization can be minor adjustments to the capital structure of the company, or can be large changes involving a change in the power structure as well. As with other leveraged transactions, if a firm cannot make its debt payments, meet its loan covenants or rollover its debt it enters financial distress which often leads to bankruptcy. Therefore, the additional debt burden of a leveraged recapitalization makes a firm more vulnerable to unexpected business problems including recessions and financial crises.

Typically a dividend recapitalization will be pursued when the equity investors are seeking to realize value from a private company but do not want to sell their interest in the business.

== Example ==
Between 2003 and 2007, 188 companies controlled by private equity firms issued more than $75 billion in debt that was used to pay dividends to the buyout firms.

In their relatively brief period of management of Hostess Brands, maker of Twinkie brand snack cakes and other products, Apollo Global Management and C. Dean Metropoulos and Company added leverage and took a $900 million dividend, "the third largest of 2015" in the private equity industry.

== See also ==
- Private equity
- Leveraged recapitalization
