= CECOSESOLA =

Venezuelan cooperative association

Central Cooperative of Social Services of Lara
- Central Cooperativa de Servicios Sociales de Lara
- Abbreviation: CECOSESOLA
- Established: 17 December 1967; 58 years ago
- Type: Cooperative federation
- Purpose: Provision of social services
- Headquarters: Carrera 4, entre calles 8 y 10, Zona Industrial
- Location: Barquisimeto, Venezuela
- Members: 23,000 (2025)
- Funding: Internal financing
- Website: cecosesola.org

The Central Cooperative of Social Services of Lara (Spanish: Central Cooperativa de Servicios Sociales de Lara; CECOSESOLA) is a cooperative federation in the Venezuelan state of Lara. It was established in 1967, when a number of cooperatives in Barquisimeto came together to provide a system of social services to their members. Following the collapse of its public transport bus service, which had operated in the late-1970s until it was shut down by the local government, the organization went through a period of reorganization. In 1983, CECOSESOLA workers abolished the cooperative's internal hierarchy and established a system of workers' self-management, which involved consensus decision-making, regular job rotation and equal pay for equal work. The organization then set up weekly food markets in the city's most underserved areas, which resulted in the rapid growth of CECOSESOLA. The organization gained enough influence that it was able to pressure the Hugo Chávez government to change the country's cooperative law. It also developed a robust solidarity economy, which gave the city of Barquisimeto a level of protection from the pervasive shortages in Venezuela. By the 21st century, CECOSESOLA had grown to count more than 20,000 active members and 150,000 customers at its food markets. Its growth enabled the organization to establish clinics, mutual savings banks and a self-managed hospital along cooperative lines.

== History ==
=== Establishment ===
During the time of the Republic of Venezuela, the country had an underdeveloped solidarity economy with few cooperatives, most of which were concentrated in the financial sector and had reformist tendencies. In the 1960s, land reform programmes by the Rómulo Betancourt government provided state support to newly-established agricultural cooperatives, although many of these soon became traditional businesses with wage labour and hierarchical decision-making. In 1966, the Raúl Leoni government passed the country's first cooperative law, which regulated state support to cooperatives. At this time, the Communist Party of Venezuela (CPV) also supported the establishment of agricultural and artisanal cooperatives throughout the country.

Venezuelan cooperatives became increasingly organized, with 18 regional cooperative federations being established in 1967. That year, members of a number of cooperatives in the Venezuelan city of Barquisimeto established the Central Cooperative of Social Services of Lara (Spanish: Central Cooperativa de Servicios Sociales de Lara; CECOSESOLA), a second-tier cooperative which would provide social services to its affiliate cooperatives and their members. It was initially founded specifically to organize affordable funerals, a service which had long been neglected by the city's private sector. CECOSESOLA members saw the organization as a means to provide their communities with cheap goods and services, with the ultimate goal of accelerating social change.

=== Bus conflict ===
Between 1974 and 1976, CECOSESOLA launched a public transport bus service in Barquisimeto. Working together with community organizations, it established the bus service's routes and schedules based on the community's needs. Over the course of the late 1970s, the service achieved marked success due to its cheap fares. The bus cooperative rapidly grew to count about 300 workers, and operated 127 buses. As it was the first service offered by CECOSESOLA that was available for use by the wider community, not just its own members, the organization sought to bring together the workers and the service's users. The cooperative held popular assemblies to organize and support the burgeoning public service.

By 1979, the bus service had brought CECOSESOLA into conflict with the municipal government. The local council demanded that CECOSESOLA align its tariffs with those of other public transport providers. When they refused, the council revoked the subsidy for CECOSESOLA's public transit operations. CECOSESOLA reacted by calling a bus strike and organising political demonstrations, while the state government attempted to use the media to influence public opinion in their favor. In 1980, the conflict culminated with the municipal police arresting several CECOSESOLA workers and confiscating their buses. CECOSESOLA responded by appealing to other cooperatives for support and pleading to Congress for the return of their buses. 140 days after the buses were seized, the municipality was handed a court order to return the buses to CECOSESOLA. At the same time, after a group of CECOSESOLA bus workers had unsuccessfully demanded a pay rise and the right to establish a trade union, they began spreading rumors about irregularities in the cooperative's administration. Although an independent investigation found no evidence of wrongdoing, it caused an increase of public mistrust of and internal conflict within the organization.

=== Organizational changes ===
Although the bus conflict was brought to an end, it caused massive losses for CECOSESOLA and many of its buses were no longer in working order. Meanwhile, in response to the internal dispute with the bus workers, 70 cooperatives and 160 workers had also left the CECOSESOLA network. This provoked a restructuring of CECOSESOLA: the organization's remaining workers decided that, from then on, the network would only make use of internal financing rather than accepting external subsidies; they also sought to promote greater participation in decision-making, encouraging workers to attend regular meetings and build social connections between themselves. By 1983, the workers of CECOSESOLA had abolished their internal hierarchy, dissolving the executive and supervisory boards, and replaced it with a system of workers' self-management. The workers themselves then implemented a system of consensus decision-making, job rotation and equal pay for equal work. In making these changes, the workers hoped to foster a spontaneous order, in which mutual trust and solidarity would guide workers' behavior. The changes made then would eventually be formalised in the organization's bylaws in 2002.

CECOSESOLA workers formulated a critique of the existing social order and hierarchical forms of organization, which they contrasted with their own mechanisms of self-management. They came to consider capitalism and consumerism to be expressions of the most individualistic aspects of Western culture, in which people sought to accumulate wealth and power for themselves at the expense of others. Workers explicitly framed the CECOSESOLA as an alternative to the existing social order and as a vehicle for social change. They began to set collective criteria for the organization, prioritizing long-term social benefits over short-term profits. These criteria were regularly reevaluated through a consensus process, often in response to internal problems or external crises. Individual workers were also empowered to make quick decisions, which would then be reported at their weekly meetings, to ensure they cohered with the collective criteria, and criticised if they belied individualistic attitudes.

=== Growth ===
As the organization's internal culture and practices increasingly distinguished itself from the existing social order, it came under attack from the local government, mass media and its economic competition. In response, CECOSESOLA workers sought to develop a support network among like-minded organizations and to grow the organization into a significant part of the regional economy, which would make it "too big to fail". Following the collapse of the bus service, in 1983, CECOSESOLA relaunched by establishing food markets in the city's poorest neighbourhoods and food deserts. This brought together the network's agricultural cooperatives with its urban consumer cooperatives, with markets being held every weekend from Friday to Sunday. By meeting this underserved section of the market, CECOSESOLA experienced rapid growth and gained legitimacy in Barquisimeto. The organization of the food markets was carried out horizontally, with the people who participated in the decision-making process carrying out those decisions themselves.

Although the organization had no interest in expanding beyond its home city, it worked with other initiatives to establish cooperative markets in Bolivia, Colombia and Egypt, and invited journalists and researchers from around the globe to visit their operations. Using their growing influence in the local economy and the media, CECOSESOLA negotiated with multinational companies and the government to provide them with access to necessary commodities such as fertilizer. Through constant communication between its members and the wider community, CECOSESOLA gained enough societal legitimacy that 95% of community members were reported to have said they would defend the cooperative if it were under threat.

Following the Bolivarian Revolution of 1999, CECOSESOLA also built ties with officials in Hugo Chávez's government and lobbied them to reform the country's law on cooperatives by repealing the requirement for them to have executive or supervisory boards. When the law was amended in 2001, they said that the old law had prevented them from taking a major role in societal development. Over the course of the early 21st century, CECOSESOLA established an international network, connecting itself with like-minded movements. CECOSESOLA has emphasised the overlap between its practice of workers' self-management and the Chávez government's socialist programme, as well as the model of Neozapatismo in Mexico and the political philosophy of José Mujica in Uruguay. The organization has also sent workers to North America and Europe to exchange their knowledge with cooperatives in other parts of the world. CECOSESOLA workers emphasised that, by creating a comprehensive system of social services, they were "reclaiming the right to enjoy a better quality of life".

By building relations with food suppliers, CECOSESOLA was able to ensure a steady supply chain even during periods of shortages in Venezuela, as suppliers favored them over supermarket chains. The solidarity economy established by CECOSESOLA was largely unaffected during the food crises of 2003 and 2018, with Barquisimeto being relatively unaffected by hunger to the same extent as the rest of the country. Having built substantial support within its community and in the wider cooperative movement in Venezuela, CECOSESOLA was also able to mobilize action against threats from the government. In 2015, when the government of Nicolás Maduro attempted to impose higher taxes on self-managed cooperatives, CECOSESOLA responded with a mass mobilization that exerted substantial political pressure on government officials. In an open letter, CECOSESOLA workers pointed out that the Maduro government was prioritizing a capitalist mode of organization over cooperatives that aligned with Chávez's Plan de la Patria.

Over the course of the 2010s, the number of people who attended CECOSESOLA's food markets increased by four times, from less than 40,000 to roughly 150,000 weekly visitors. By 2018, the markets were distributing 800 tonnes of perishable food products every week. Through participatory decision-making and internal fundraising, CECOSESOLA oversaw the design, planning and construction of a self-managed hospital in Barquisimeto. Although respected for their expertise, the hospital's doctors were not given authority over the management of the hospital, in which all workers were considered equal. During the COVID-19 pandemic, the horizontal networks developed by CECOSESOLA were mobilized in support of the poor and immunosuppressed.

== Organization ==
=== Network ===
As of 2014, the CECOSESOLA network counted 29 affiliated cooperatives and about 20 community organizations The CECOSESOLA network grows, processes and sells its own food to the wider community, provides health care, credit and funerals for its members, distributes home appliances and organizes community education in its local area. The network runs farmers' markets, clinics, blood testing laboratories, savings banks, money lending and insurance operations, and a hospital, all of which are organized as worker cooperatives. Although some cooperatives focus on a single sector, most CECOSESOLA affiliates have diversified their activities across multiple sectors. Of the organization's 20,000 members: 1,000 are organized into worker cooperatives, 18,700 into consumer cooperatives and 300 into producer cooperatives. Each member organization is independently self-managed and linked together with others through a federative system. Italian sociologist Dario Azzellini described it as Venzuela's "most successful cooperative".

=== Primary worker cooperative ===
CECOSESOLA also organizes its own primary worker cooperative under its own name; of its 629 worker-owners, 539 work in the organization's food markets, 68 in its health service, 19 in its funeral home and 13 in its financial, administrative and educational services. The CECOSESOLA cooperative is run through workers' self-management, without any formal hierarchy. Workers regularly rotate jobs, use consensus decision-making and are given equal pay for equal work. Larger-scale coordination is carried out by rotating groups of workers, which provides each of them with a broader view of how the cooperative functions. The only workers that do not participate in job rotation are the doctors at the CECOSESOLA health center, as their high level of specialization precludes them being rotated into other roles.

== Internal culture ==
Regular meetings are a key part of CECOSESOLA's internal culture of participatory decision-making, which is intended to build trust, solidarity, collective responsibility and mutual aid between its participants. Meeting participants are encouraged to share all available information about a certain matter, so that everyone can shape their opinion on the task at hand. Discussions take place without moderators, as speakers are expected to wait for their own turn, to not interrupt others and to keep their speaking time brief.

CECOSESOLA has a high rate of employee turnover, which has made the organization selective of the people it hires. New workers are required to be introduced into the cooperative by other workers, who then act as their mentor, oversee their socialization within the cooperative and acquaint them with how the cooperative functions. Mentors themselves are held responsible when new workers are reprimanded for misbehavior. This method of recruitment has maintained a high level of institutional memory in the organization, as new members are educated about the organization's values and history by more experienced workers. CECOSESOLA members often recall the organization's history and core values in meetings and recount them to customers, journalists and politicians, emphasizing person-to-person relationships as central to the dynamic of workers' self-management.

CECOSESOLA ensures that workers personally identify themselves with the values of the cooperative, even to the extent of overruling their private life. When interviewed about the cooperative, some members have expressed their affection for the organization in romantic terms, describing it as a relationship in which communication is essential. Workers often have little room for privacy, as their work tasks are performed collectively and their meals are eaten with their colleagues. The work day at CECOSESOLA can stretch up to 15 hours, which leaves them with little time for leisure. Discussing the cooperative's long working days are one of its few taboos and requesting time off requires workers to justify themselves before the entire collective. CECOSESOLA workers are encouraged to strengthen ties with their friends and family, in order to enlarge the organization's social circle. They also often use specialized vocabulary within the workplace and dress themselves in the organization's branded clothing. The organization seeks to avoid the establishment of subgroups, whether by age, gender or job, and aims for everyone in the cooperative to closely know everyone else. Workers are also incentivized to align themselves with the collective through its many social benefits, including stable employment, relatively high wages and access to cheap social services.

Without any organizational hierarchy, discipline and compliance with the organization's collective criteria is ensured through peer pressure. Individual misconduct is publicly denounced and subjected to a collective tribunal. Workers have reported that, without such disciplinary actions taking place, misconduct can perpetuate itself without any opportunities for improvement. Punishments involved temporary suspension from the organization, or in more extreme cases when workers felt their trust had been broken, permanent suspension.

== Bibliography ==
- Azzellini, Dario (2013). "From Cooperatives to Enterprises of Direct Social Property in the Venezuelan Process". In Harnecker, Camila Piñeiro (ed.). Cooperatives and Socialism. Palgrave Macmillan. pp. 259–275. doi:10.1057/9781137277756_12. ISBN 9781137277756.
- Soetens, Aurélie; Huybrechts, Benjamin; Bretos, Ignacio (2023). "Decades of Radical Self-Management at a Venezuelan Cooperative: Institutional Distinctiveness and Ideology". In Novković, Sonja; Miner, Karen; McMahon, Cian (eds.). Humanistic Governance in Democratic Organizations: The Cooperative Difference. Palgrave Macmillan. pp. 361–396. doi:10.1007/978-3-031-17403-2_12. ISBN 978-3-031-17405-6.
- Stavrides, Stavros (2024). "Cooperation as Commoning". The Politics of Urban Potentiality: Spatial Patterns of Emancipatory Commoning. Bloomsbury Publishing. pp. 115–146. ISBN 978-1-3504-1397-9.
- Williams, Michelle; Satgar, Vishwas (2019). "Emancipatory alternatives: worker cooperatives and the solidarity economy". In Dörre, Klaus; Rosa, Hartmut; Becker, Karina; Bose, Sophie; Seyd, Benjamin (eds.). Große Transformation? Zur Zukunft moderner Gesellschaften. Springer VS. pp. 455–468. doi:10.1007/978-3-658-25947-1_25. ISBN 978-3-658-25947-1.
