= Hugo Cancio =

Cuban-born American businessman and political activist

Hugo Miguel Cancio
- Born: 1964 (age 60–61); Cuba
- Education: Miami Beach Senior High School
- Occupation: Businessman
- Known for: Founder and CEO, Fuego Enterprises
- Children: 3 daughters
- Parent(s): Miguel Cancio; Monica Morua

Hugo Cancio (born 1964) is a Cuban-born American businessman and political activist. He is the founder and chief executive officer of Fuego Enterprises, a diversified holding company active in media and entertainment, telecommunications, travel, and real estate both in Cuba and the United States.

== Early life ==
Hugo Cancio was born in 1964 in Cuba. His father, Miguel Cancio, was a member of Los Zafiros, a Cuban musical group. His mother, Monica Morua, was a singer under the stage name of Monica Leticia. His parents divorced and his mother remarried. He has a sister. Cancio was educated at boarding school in Matanzas.Prior to that, in 1977-1978, he received a scholarship at a rural school located in Jaguey Grande called "José Alfredo Sosa Morales" from where he had to be taken out by his mother in less than a year due to the crises of asthma they gave him; At that time he lived in Varadero, he looked like a young man with economic solvency, he was calm and discreet; he does not express any political position. However, he was expelled after he told an anti-Castro joke.

With his mother, Cancio emigrated to the United States on the Mariel boatlift in 1980. He pretended to the Cuban government that he was a homosexual to be granted the authorization to leave. They settled in Miami Beach, Florida, where Cancio attended Miami Beach Senior High School. Meanwhile, his father, who was dismissed from his job at the Cuban Ministry of Culture when his son left Cuba, emigrated to the United States as a political refugee in 1993.

== Career ==
Cancio is the founder and chief executive officer of Fuego Enterprises, known as the Cuba Business Development Group until October 2012, a diversified holding company active in media and entertainment, telecommunications, travel, and real estate both in Cuba and the United States. It is publicly traded on the OTC Markets Group. Its largest shareholder is Thomas J. Herzfeld.

Cancio started his career by working as a busboy in a kosher restaurant in Miami, and quickly went into the car dealership industry. In the 1990s, he founded Viajes a Cuba, a travel business for Americans visiting Cuba, after receiving a license to do business in Cuba from the Office of Foreign Assets Control. In 1997, he produced a documentary film about his father's group, Zafiros: Blue Madness. The film won the People's Choice Award at the 1997 Havana Film Festival.

Cancio later worked as a music promoter. He is the owner of 1962 live recordings by The Beatles. However, his acquisition of those rights was questioned by a lawsuit from Apple Corps in 2008, on the basis that the group never consented to the recordings in the first place; the two entities subsequently reached an amicable settlement. Additionally, he has represented Cuban performers like Silvio Rodríguez, Pablo Milanés, Los Van Van and NG La Banda when they performed in the US.

Since 2012, Cancio has published two bilingual magazines, OnCuba and ART OnCuba, both of which are sold in the US and Cuba. OnCuba appears on the El Paquete Semanal. He also publishes a real estate magazine, and an arts magazine called Art On Cuba.

Cancio founded OnCuba Travel, which provides guided tours of Havana to American tourists, in 2012. He is also the owner of MAScell, a Miami-based company which sells prepaid mobile phone cards in Cuba. Meanwhile, in 2013, Fuego Enterprises acquired of 51% of The Americas Group Cuba Business Enterprise, a Cuban-American business advisory company founded by Howard Glicken.

== Political activism ==
Cancio was banned from entering Cuba for a year in 2003 for his support of the Cuban dissident movement. However, he is an admirer of Fidel Castro's "tenacity", including his role in the Cuban Revolution. He has been accused of being a Communist.

Cancio is a long-standing opponent of the United States embargo against Cuba. During the Presidency of George W. Bush, he founded Cambio Cubano, an anti-embargo organization. Shortly after the election of President Barack Obama, he visited Cuba and met with official of the Central Committee of the Communist Party of Cuba to promote Cuban culture in the United States. In 2013, alongside 60 Cuban-Americans, he signed an open letter addressed to President Barack Obama to remove Cuba from the list of State Sponsors of Terrorism, in contradistinction with the views expressed by Cuban-American congresspeople from South Florida. Meanwhile, he met officials of the Cuban government and paved the way for the United States–Cuban Thaw.

== Personal life ==
Cancio has three daughters. He resides in Miami, Florida.
