= Bankruptcy costs of debt =

Within the theory of corporate finance, bankruptcy costs of debt are the increased costs of financing with debt instead of equity that result from a higher probability of bankruptcy. The fact that bankruptcy is generally a costly process in itself and not only a transfer of ownership implies that these costs negatively affect the total value of the firm. These costs can be thought of as a financial cost, in the sense that the cost of financing increases because the probability of bankruptcy increases. One way to understand this is to realize that when a firm goes bankrupt investors holding its debt are likely to lose part or all of their investment, and therefore investors require a higher rate of return when investing in bonds of a firm that can easily go bankrupt. This implies that an increase in debt which ends up increasing a firm's bankruptcy probability causes an increase in these bankruptcy costs of debt.

In the trade-off theory of capital structure, firms are supposedly choosing their level of debt financing by trading off these bankruptcy costs of debt against tax benefits of debt. In particular, a firm that is trying to maximize the value for its shareholders will equalize the marginal cost of debt that results from these bankruptcy costs with the marginal benefit of debt that results from tax benefits.

In the personal bankruptcy there is a cost associated with filling the paperwork. In the United States, for Chapter 13 Bankruptcy there is a fee of $281 and for Chapter 7 Bankruptcy it is $306. Additionally there can be other payments required, like Lawyer's fee, Conversion fee, Credit counselling and debtor education fee.

== See also ==
- Corporate finance
- Trade-Off Theory
- Capital structure
- Tax benefits of debt
- Financial distress
- Financial risk management
