= Trade-off theory of capital structure =

Financial concept

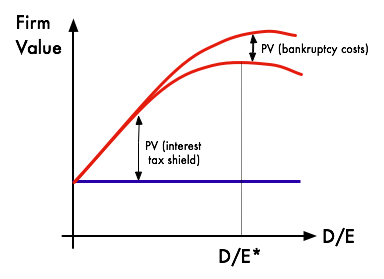
As the debt equity ratio (i.e. leverage) increases, there is a trade-off between the interest tax shield and bankruptcy, causing an optimum capital structure, D/E*. The top curve shows the tax shield gains of debt financing, while the bottom curve includes that minus the costs of bankruptcy.

The trade-off theory of capital structure is the idea that a company chooses how much debt finance and how much equity finance to use by balancing the costs and benefits. The classical version of the hypothesis goes back to Kraus and Litzenberger who considered a balance between the dead-weight costs of bankruptcy and the tax saving benefits of debt. Often agency costs are also included in the balance. This theory is often set up as a competitor theory to the pecking order theory of capital structure. A review of the trade-off theory and its supporting evidence is provided by Ai, Frank, and Sanati.

An important purpose of the theory is to explain the fact that corporations usually are financed partly with debt and partly with equity. It states that there is an advantage to financing with debt, the tax benefits of debt and there is a cost of financing with debt, the costs of financial distress including bankruptcy costs of debt and non-bankruptcy costs (e.g. staff leaving, suppliers demanding disadvantageous payment terms, bondholder/stockholder infighting, etc.). The marginal benefit of further increases in debt declines as debt increases, while the marginal cost increases, so that a firm that is optimizing its overall value will focus on this trade-off when choosing how much debt and equity to use for financing.

== Evidence ==
The empirical relevance of the trade-off theory has often been questioned. Miller for example compared this balancing as akin to the balance between horse and rabbit content in a stew of one horse and one rabbit. Taxes are large and they are sure, while bankruptcy is rare and, according to Miller, it has low dead-weight costs. Accordingly, he suggested that if the trade-off theory were true, then firms ought to have much higher debt levels than we observe in reality. Myers was a particularly fierce critic in his presidential address to the American Finance Association meetings in which he proposed what he called "the pecking order theory". Fama and French criticized both the trade-off theory and the pecking order theory in different ways. Welch has argued that firms do not undo the impact of stock price shocks as they should under the basic trade-off theory and so the mechanical change in asset prices that makes up for most of the variation in capital structure.

Despite such criticisms, the trade-off theory remains the dominant theory of corporate capital structure as taught in the main corporate finance textbooks. Dynamic versions of the model generally seem to offer enough flexibility in matching the data so, contrary to Miller's verbal argument, dynamic trade-off models are very hard to reject empirically.

== See also ==
- Capital structure
- Capital structure substitution theory
- Cost of capital
- Corporate finance
- Market timing hypothesis
- Pecking order theory
