= Fuego Enterprises =

American holding company

Fuego Enterprises, known as the Cuba Business Development Group until October 2012, is an American diversified holding company based in Miami, Florida, and active in media and entertainment, telecommunications, travel, and real estate, both in Cuba and the United States.

It was founded in 2004 by Hugo Cancio, who is also the chief executive officer.

Its publications include OnCuba and ART OnCuba, which are monthly and quarterly bilingual magazines national distribution.

In October 2016, Fuego acquired porlalivre.com, a Cuban Internet portal similar to Craigslist.
