= 100 Best Companies to Work For =

Fortune magazine listing

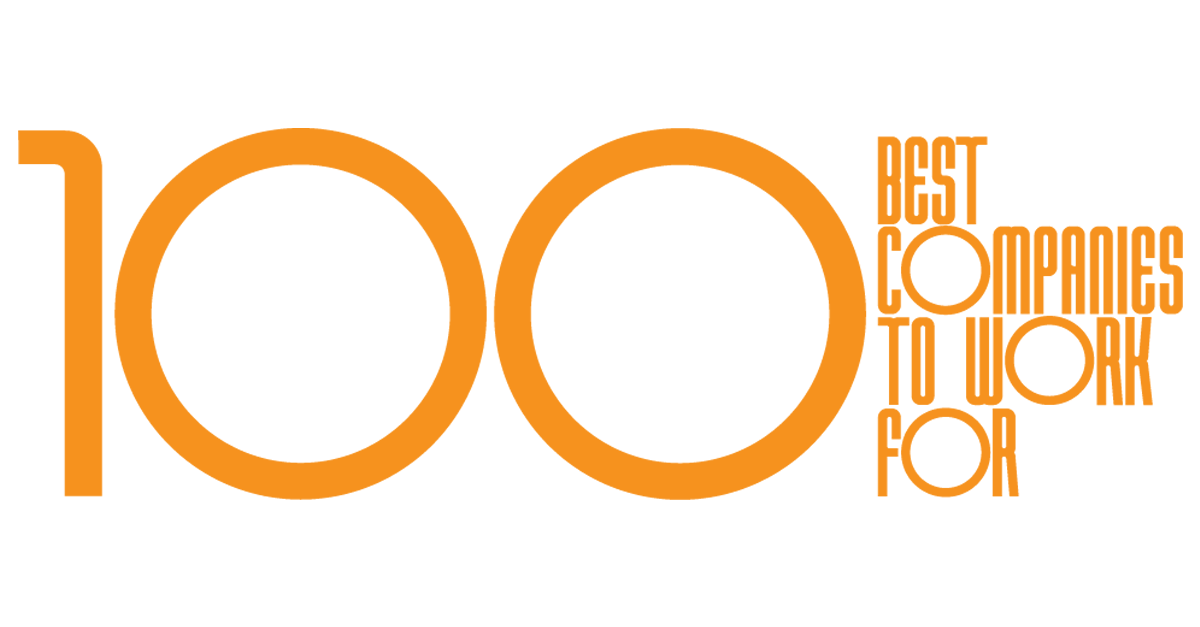
The logo of Fortune's 100 Best Companies to Work For list.

The 100 Best Companies to Work For is an annual list published by Fortune magazine that ranks U.S. companies based on employee happiness and perks. Like the Fortune 500, the list includes both public and private companies. The list was first published in 1998. Hilton Worldwide received No. 1 placement in the most recent 2025 ranking, followed by Synchrony Financial, Cisco, American Express, and Nvidia.

== Methodology ==
To compile the list, Fortune partners with the Great Place to Work Institute to survey a random group of employees from each company. A company's score is based on the "Trust Index Employee Survey" and the "Culture Audit."

According to the magazine, the Trust Index "asks questions related to employees' attitudes about management's credibility, overall job satisfaction, and camaraderie." The Culture Audit includes "detailed questions about pay and benefit programs and a series of open-ended questions about hiring practices, methods of internal communication, training, recognition programs, and diversity efforts."

Fortune's articles about the list have been criticized as being too superficial in focusing primarily on perks, leadership, and financial success as opposed to actual workplace culture and sense of purpose that the list's methodology is concerned with.

== Results ==
Alphabet has ranked first eight times and appeared every year from 2006 until 2018 (the company also disappeared from Glassdoor's similar list). Additionally, Wegmans, SAS Institute, W. L. Gore, REI, Goldman Sachs, TDIndustries, Publix, Four Seasons, Whole Foods, The Container Store, Cisco, Marriott, Genentech and Nordstrom have all have been on the list at least 17 times.

In 2011, finance professor Alex Edmans published a paper in the Journal of Financial Economics showing that the 100 Best Companies to Work For outperformed their peers in total shareholder returns by 2.1–3.5% from 1984–2009.

== Previous years ==
- 1998
- 1999
- 2000
- 2001
- 2002
- 2003
- 2004
- 2005
- 2006
- 2007
- 2008
- 2009
- 2010
- 2011
- 2012
- 2013
- 2014
- 2015
- 2016
- 2017
- 2018
- 2019
- 2020
- 2021
- 2022
- 2023
- 2024
- 2025

== See also ==
- 40 Under 40 (Fortune magazine)
- Other Fortune lists
