= Listed investment company =

A listed investment company (LIC) is an Australian closed-end collective investment scheme similar to investment trusts in the UK and closed-end funds in the United States. Instead of regularly issuing new shares or canceling shares as investors join and leave the fund, investors buy and sell to each other on the ASX. They are traded like other securities on the Australian stock exchange.

== See also ==
- Collective investment schemes for generic information.

== Advantages ==
- Listed Investment Companies are a closed end investment, meaning that management do not have to worry about people withdrawing funds. If people wish to exit the investment they can simply sell their shares, without affecting the amount of funds under management. This allows for management to take a more long term approach to investing if deemed favourable (Viney, 2007).
- Traditional LICs employ this buy and hold strategy which can result in tax advantages (for example Australia's system of paying capital gains tax on only half of capital gains if an asset is held for 12 months). This strategy also amounts to lower costs for LICs and traditionally lower fees. However, contemporary LICs often take a more active approach to portfolio management (Ross, 2007).
- LICs provide a lot of diversification for investors, while often targeting specific markets, such as international equities, Indian equities, or Chinese property (Viney, 2007).
- LICs must comply with transparency and governance regulation imposed by the Australian Securities Exchange (Ross, 2007).

== Disadvantages ==
- Owners of shares in listed companies must ride out the volatility of the share price which can divert from net tangible assets per share as the market digests related news. (Shapiro, 2006)
- Dividends from LICs are paid out as management see fit (as opposed to mandatory distribution of all surplus funds as in unlisted managed funds. (Ross, 2007)
