= Pecking order theory =

Theory that firms prefer internal funds, then debt, and use equity last

In corporate finance, the pecking order theory (or pecking order model) postulates that "firms prefer to finance their investments internally, using retained earnings, before turning to external sources of financing such as debt or equity" - i.e. there is a "pecking order" when it comes to financing decisions. The theory was first suggested by Gordon Donaldson in 1961 and was modified by Stewart C. Myers and Nicolas Majluf in 1984.

== Theory ==
The theory assumes asymmetric information, and that the firm's financing decision constitutes a signal to the market. Under the theory, managers know more about their company's prospects, risks and value than outside investors; see efficient market hypothesis. This asymmetry affects the choice between internal and external financing and between the issue of debt or equity: companies prioritize their sources of financing, first preferring internal financing, and then debt, with equity financing seen as a "last resort". Here, the issue of debt signals the board's confidence that an investment is profitable; further, the current stock price is undervalued, mitigating against issuing shares at these levels. The issue of equity, on the other hand, would signal some lack of confidence, or at least that the share is over-valued. An issue of equity may then lead to a drop in share price. (This does not however apply to high-tech industries where the issue of equity is preferable, due to the high cost of debt issue as assets are intangible.) Other more practical consderations include the fact that issue costs are least for internal funds, low for debt and highest for equity. Further, issuing shares means "bringing external ownership" into the company, leading to stock dilution.

The pecking order theory may explain the inverse relationship between profitability and debt ratios, and, in that dividends are a use of capital, the theory also links to the firm's dividend policy. In general, internally generated cash flow may exceed required capital expenditures, and at other times will fall short. Thus when profitable, since firms prefer internal financing, the firm will pay off debt, leading to a reduction in the ratio. When profit or cashflow falls short, rather than relying on external financing, the firm first draws down its cash balance or sells its marketable securities. Coupled with this is the fact that the larger the dividend paid, the less funds are available for reinvestment, and the more the company will have to rely on external financing to fund its investments. Thus the dividend payout ratio may also "adapt" to the firm's investment opportunities and current cash levels.

== Evidence ==
Tests of the pecking order theory have not been able to show that it is of first-order importance in determining a firm's capital structure. However, several authors have found that there are instances where it is a good approximation of reality. Zeidan, Galil and Shapir (2018) document that owners of private firms in Brazil follow the pecking order theory, and also Myers and Shyam-Sunder (1999) find that some features of the data are better explained by the pecking order than by the trade-off theory. Frank and Goyal show, among other things, that pecking order theory fails where it should hold, namely for small firms where information asymmetry is presumably an important problem.

== See also ==
- Capital structure § Variations on the Miller-Modigliani theorem
- Capital structure substitution theory
- Cost of capital
- Market timing hypothesis
- Outline of corporate finance § Theory
- Trade-off theory of capital structure
