= Alan Marcus =

American economist

Alan J. Marcus
- Education: Wesleyan University, Massachusetts Institute of Technology
- Occupations: Economist, Author, Professor
- Employer(s): Professor at the Carroll School of Management, Boston College

Alan J. Marcus is an American economist, and the first recipient of the Mario J. Gabelli Endowed Professorship at the Carroll School of Management at Boston College, where he currently teaches. He is an author of several textbooks widely used in finance and MBA programs internationally, including Fundamentals of Corporate Finance with Stewart Myers and Richard A. Brealey. Marcus serves on the advisory board of the CFA Institute.

== Education and background ==
Marcus graduated with high honors, summa cum laude, and Phi Beta Kappa, from Wesleyan University, in 1976. He received his PhD in economics at Massachusetts Institute of Technology in 1981. He also served as a Research Fellow at the National Bureau of Economic Research, working with Pension, Monetary Economics, and Financial Markets groups.

=== Academic appointments ===
- 1981–1990, Boston University
- 1994 (summer), visiting professor at the Athens Laboratory of Business Administration (ALBA)
- 1996 and 1997, visiting professor at the MIT Sloan School of Management
- 1991–present, professor at the Wallace E. Carroll School of Management at Boston College

== Bibliography ==
Marcus has co-authored textbooks and his work has been published in the area of capital markets and portfolio theory. Some of his works are listed below.

=== Books ===
- Essentials of Investments, ninth edition, 2013 (with Alex Kane and Zvi Bodie)
- Fundamentals of Corporate Finance, seventh edition, 2012 (with A. Kane and Z.Bodie)
- Investments, ninth edition, 2011 (with A. Kane and Z. Bodie)

=== Journal articles ===
- “Relative Sentiment and Stock Returns,” Financial Analysts Journal, 66 (July/August 2010), with Roger M. Edelen and Hassan Tehranian.
- “Opaque Financial Reports, R-square, and Crash Risk,” Journal of Financial Economics, 94 (October 2009), with Amy Hutton and Hassan Tehranian, 67–86.
- “Corporate Governance and Pay-for-Performance: The Impact of Earnings Management,” Journal of Financial Economics, 87 (February 2008), 357–373, with Marcia Cornett and Hassan Tehranian.
- “The Impact of Institutional Ownership on Corporate Operating Performance,” Journal of Banking and Finance, 31 (June 2007), 1771–1794, with Marcia Cornett, Anthony Saunders, and Hassan Tehranian.
- “Optimal Estimation of the Risk Premium for the Long Run and Asset Allocation: A Case of Compounded Estimation Risk,” Journal of Financial Econometrics, 3 (2005), 37–55, with Eric Jacquier and Alex Kane.
