= Principles of Corporate Finance =

Non-fiction work by Richard A. Brealey

- First edition (1980)
- Author: Richard Brealey, Stewart Myers, Franklin Allen, Alex Edmans
- Language: English
- Series: McGraw-Hill/Irwin Series in Finance, Insurance and Real Estate
- Subject: Finance
- Genre: Textbook
- Publisher: McGraw-Hill/Irwin
- Publication date: April 22, 2022 (14th edition)
- Publication place: United States
- Media type: Print, e-book
- Pages: 1056 pp.
- ISBN: 978-1265074159
- Followed by: Fundamentals of Corporate Finance

Principles of Corporate Finance is a reference work on the corporate finance theory edited by Richard Brealey, Stewart Myers, Franklin Allen, and Alex Edmans. The book is one of the leading texts that describes the theory and practice of corporate finance. It was initially published in October 1980 and now is available in its 14th edition. Principles of Corporate Finance has earned loyalty both as a classroom tool and as a professional reference book.

== Overview ==
The book covers a wide range of aspects relevant to corporate finance, illustrated by examples and case studies. The text starts by explaining basic finance concepts of value, risk, and other principles. Then the issues become more and more complex, from project analysis and net present value calculations to debt policy and option valuation. Other discussed topics include stakeholder theory, corporate governance, mergers and acquisitions, principal–agent problems, credit risk, working capital management, etc. The book concludes with a discussion on the current limitations of corporate finance theory.
