= Tax benefits of debt =

In the context of corporate finance, the tax benefits of debt or tax advantage of debt refers to the fact that from a tax perspective it is cheaper for firms and investors to finance with debt than with equity. Under a majority of taxation systems around the world, and until recently under the United States tax system, firms are taxed on their profits and individuals are taxed on their personal income.

For example, a firm that earns $100 in profits in the United States would have to pay around $30 in taxes. If it then distributes these profits to its owners as dividends, then the owners in turn pay taxes on this income, say $20 on the $70 of dividends. The $100 of profits turned into $50 of investor income.

If, instead the firm finances with debt, then, assuming the firm owes $100 of interest to investors, its profits are now 0. Investors now pay taxes on their interest income, say $30. This implies for $100 of profits before taxes, investors got $70.

This tax-related encouragement of debt financing has not gone uncriticized. For example, some critics have argued that the cost of equity should also be deductible; which could reduce the Internal Revenue Code's influence on capital-structure decisions, potentially reducing the economic instability attributable to excessive debt financing.

== See also ==
- Trade-Off Theory
- Capital structure
- Dividend tax
