= Zvi Bodie =

American academic

- Born: April 27, 1943 (age 83)
- Citizenship: U.S.

Academic background
- Education: Brooklyn College (BA); Hebrew University of Jerusalem (MA); Massachusetts Institute of Technology (PhD)
- Doctoral advisor: Stanley Fischer

Zvi Bodie (born April 27, 1943) is an American economist, author and professor. He was the Norman and Adele Barron Professor of Management at Boston University, teaching finance at Questrom for 43 years before retiring in 2015. His textbook, Investments (with Kane and Marcus) is the market leader and is used in the certification programs of the CFA Institute and the Society of Actuaries. Bodie's work has centered on pension finance and investment strategy. He continues to do consulting work and media interviews.

== Education and background ==
Bodie holds a Ph.D. in economics (1975) from the Massachusetts Institute of Technology, a M.A. in economics (1970) from the Hebrew University, and a B.A. with Honors in philosophy (1965) from Brooklyn College.

He has served on the finance faculty at the Harvard Business School and MIT Sloan School of Management. Bodie was on the editorial board of the Journal of Pension Economics and Finance, and served as an advisory member to the World Bank Project on Old Age Security. He was also a consultant to the State of Israel concerning reform of their pension system.

In 2007 the Retirement Income Industry Association gave Bodie their Lifetime Achievement Award for applied research, and in 2019 he received the Plan Sponsor Council of America's Lifetime Achievement Award. He also won the Financial Analysts Journal Graham and Dodd Scroll in 1985 and 1996.

== Investment philosophy ==
Bodie advocates a defensive investment strategy that centers around diversifying, hedging, insuring and saving.

In 1995 he offered a warning about the risks of investing heavily in stocks, in a journal article: On the Risk of Stocks in the Long Run.

In 2003, he said "people who have been following conventional investment advice are probably taking more risk than they should and don't even know it. They've been told not to worry about the stock market going down because in the long-run, stocks are going to beat everything else. That's a fundamental fallacy."

After the 2008 financial crisis, in a 2009 interview, he advised:

"Unless you have the heart of a high stakes gambler, get out of stocks now and put your retirement money in inflation protected government bonds and similar instruments. These investments are immune to the kind of calamity Wall Street experienced last year, and they are guaranteed to keep pace with inflation, a potential problem in the future."

He added "he follow[ed] his own advice and did not lose a penny in the recent market meltdown." But Bodie offered his advice in March 2009, at the end of the bear market. In the following years stock markets rose sharply, the Dow Jones for example more than doubled in the following five years.

Bodie has promoted his system of investment and retirement planning in numerous interviews on PBS, CNN and other media outlets over the years.

== Bibliography ==
Bodie has authored and co-authored multiple books and textbooks, and his written works have focused on pension finance and investment strategy. Some of his work is listed below.

=== Books ===
- Essentials of Investments, (with Alex Kane and Alan Marcus), McGraw-Hill/Irwind, 11th edition, 2019.
- Investments, (with Alex Kane and Alan Marcus), McGraw-Hill, 11th edition, 2012.
- Risk Less and Prosper: Your Guide to Safer Investing, (with Rachelle Taqqu), Jon Wiley & Sons, 2011.
- The Future of Life Cycle Savings and Investing, (with Dennis McLeavy and Laurence B. Siegel), Research Foundation of CFA Institute, 2009.
- Financial Economics, (with Robert Merton and David Cleeton), Prentice Hall, 2nd edition, 2008.
- Worry-Free Investing: A Safe Approach to Achieving Your Lifetime Goals, (with Michael J. Clowes), Financial Times/Prentice Hall, 1st edition, 2003.

=== Journal articles ===
- "Do a firm's equity returns reflect the risk of its pension plan?," Journal of Financial Economics, Volume 81, Issue 1, with Li Jin, 2006.
- "Personal Investing: Advice, Theory, and Evidence," Financial Analysts Journal, Volume 53, Issue 6, with Dwight B. Crane, 1997.
- "On the Risk of Stocks in the Long Run," Financial Analysts Journal, Volume 51, Issue 3, 1995.
- "Risk and Return in Commodity Futures," Financial Analysts Journal, Volume 36, Issue 3, with Victor I. Rosansky, 1980.
- "Common Stocks as a Hedge Against Inflation," The Journal of Finance, Volume 31, Issue 2, 1976.
