= Hot equity periods =

In the study of financial markets, hot equity periods or hot issue periods are periods of time in which many firms perform initial public offering (IPO) of their equity. Firms in modern economies often finance themselves by the issuance in public markets of shares, also called equity. It turns out that these initial public offerings tend to cluster in time, so that one year, many firms might be doing an IPO, while next year, very few firms do it. These periods, in which many firms perform an IPO are called Hot Equity Periods.
