= Thomas J. Herzfeld =

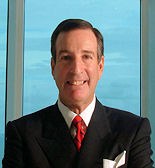
- Born: 1945 (age 80–81); New York City
- Education: Philadelphia University (BSc); Philadelphia University (Honorary Ph.D.)
- Spouse: Rutli (m. 1970)
- Children: 2
- Writing career
- Genre: Closed End Funds
- Notable works: founder, Chairman and President of Thomas J. Herzfeld Advisors, Inc.
- Notable awards: HON LHD (2008) HON Order of Kentucky Colonels (2000)

Thomas J. Herzfeld (born 1945 in New York City) is the founder, Chairman and President of Thomas J. Herzfeld Advisors, Inc., an investment firm specializing in the field of closed-end funds. Herzfeld is also the Chairman and President of The Herzfeld Caribbean Basin Fund Inc., the first closed-end fund formed to invest in the Caribbean region (as well as Cuba, when permitted). Herzfeld wrote the first of his six books on the subject of closed-end funds in 1979. He is the publisher of The Investor's Guide to Closed-End Funds monthly research report and is quoted and interviewed on the subject by publications such as the Wall Street Journal, New York Times and Financial Times. He has served as a contributing editor for the Global Guide to Investing (published by Financial Times), and The Encyclopedia of Investments. He has appeared annually on the Nightly Business Report (PBS) show for 30 years and was interviewed on the show Wall $treet Week with Louis Rukeyser several times.

== Education ==
Herzfeld graduated from Philadelphia University in 1966. He served in the United States Army Reserve from 1966-1972, and on active duty in 1967. He received an honorary Doctor of Humane Letters (LHD) from Philadelphia University in 2008 with Steve Forbes, editor-in-chief of Forbes Magazine.

== Career ==
He joined the Wall Street firm Reynolds & Co., in 1968 and began a specialization in closed-end funds. He is widely considered to be the leading expert in the field. He formed the NYSE member firm of Carlino, Herzfeld and Kemm in 1970 and served as the firm's Senior Partner at the age of 25. He also became an Allied Member of the NYSE, an Associate Member of the AMEX and a senior register options principal. In 1981, he formed a stock brokerage firm, Thomas J. Herzfeld & Co., Inc., that was the first to specialize in the field of closed-end funds. In 1984, he formed the advisory arm, Thomas J. Herzfeld Advisors, Inc. and later in 1994 The Herzfeld Caribbean Basin Fund, the first closed-end fund to invest in the Caribbean Basin (and Cuba when allowed). He created the industry's first and only Closed-End Fund Index, "The Herzfeld Average," which has been published in Barron’s weekly since its establishment in 1987. He also coined the term “lifeboat provisions” used in the industry to define tactics funds take to narrow discounts and keep prices afloat. Additionally he is also referred to as: Mr. Closed-End, Guru, The man whose name is synonymous with closed-end funds Maven from Miami, The Top Market Timer and the Dow Beaters. Herzfeld has spent more than 40 years managing closed end fund investments.

== Personal life ==
Herzfeld married his wife Rutli, a fashion model from Copenhagen, Denmark, in 1970. They have two children: both have graduate degrees from MIT and work for Thomas J. Herzfeld Advisors, Inc. He is an avid yachtsman. He also owns a penthouse condo in New York City and Miami.

== Selected bibliography ==
- Thomas J Herzfeld (1997). The Thomas J. Herzfeld 1997/1998 Encyclopedia of Closed-End Funds. Thomas J. Herzfeld Advisors, Incorporated. ISBN 978-1-891352-00-3.
- Thomas J Herzfeld and Robert F. Drach (1980). High-Return, Low Risk Investment: Using Stock Selection and Market Timing, First Edition. G.P. Putnam's Sons (Penguin Group). ISBN 978-0-07-028449-4.
- Thomas J Herzfeld and Robert F. Drach (1993). High-Return, Low Risk Investment: Using Stock Selection and Market Timing, Second Edition. McGraw-Hill. ISBN 978-0-07-028449-4.
- Thomas J Herzfeld (1980). The Investors's Guide to Closed-End Funds, The Herzfeld Hedge. McGraw-Hill. ISBN 978-0-07-028417-3.
- Thomas J Herzfeld (1993). Herzfeld's Guide to Closed-End Funds. McGraw-Hill. ISBN 978-1-4292-1887-0.
