= External financing =

In the theory of capital structure, external financing is the phrase used to describe funds that firms obtain from outside of the firm. It is contrasted to internal financing which consists mainly of profits retained by the firm for investment. There are many kinds of external financing. The two main ones are equity issues, (IPOs or SEOs), but trade credit is also considered external financing as are accounts payable, and taxes owed to the government. External financing is generally thought to be more expensive than internal financing, because the firm often has to pay a transaction cost to obtain it.

Possible ways are Peer to peer funding, Business angels, Crowdfunding, Bond issues or Loans.

== General ==
Equity and debt financing represent the total financing of companies and other legal entities (such as local authorities). They provide information on the origin of the financing funds, which in the case of equity financing come from the shareholders or from the company itself (retention of earnings and depreciation and amortization) and in the case of debt financing from creditors or from the company itself (recognition of provisions). If the source of financing is within the company itself, it is referred to as internal financing; otherwise, it is external financing. The limit of external financing lies in the maintenance of liquidity, because the debt service (loan interest and repayment) for the existing external financing burdens liquidity as expenses. Debt financing is recorded in the balance sheet under borrowed capital.

== See also ==
- Internal financing
- Capital structure
