= Jonathan Berk =

Academic

Jonathan B. Berk is the A.P. Giannini Professor of Finance at the Stanford Graduate School of Business. He has held this position since 2008. Prior to his arrival at Stanford University, he was the Sylvan Coleman Professor of Finance at the University of California, Berkeley. He worked as an analyst for Goldman Sachs before beginning his academic career.

Berk was born on April 22, 1962, in Johannesburg, South Africa. He earned his BA in physics at Rice University in 1984. He continued to earn his MA and MPhil degrees in finance in 1989, and his PhD in finance in 1990, at Yale University. Berk is known for his theoretical research in Corporate Finance, particularly in the fields of money management, asset pricing, corporate capital structure, labor and market interactions, and the theories of market rationality. He is widely published and highly cited in these areas.

Berk has received numerous awards and recognitions for original work, including the Stephen A. Ross Prize in Financial Economics, the TIAA-CREF Paul A. Samuelson Award (2005) the Smith Breeden Prize (1999) Best Paper of the Year in the Review of Financial Studies, and the FAME Research Prize.
