= Franklin Allen =

British economist and academic

- Born: 6 March 1956 (age 70)

Academic background
- Education: University of East Anglia (B.A.); Nuffield College, Oxford (D.Phil)
- Doctoral advisor: James Mirrlees

Academic work
- Discipline: Financial economics
- Institutions: University of Pennsylvania; Imperial College London

Franklin Allen, FBA (born 6 March 1956) is a British economist and academic. Since 2014, he has been professor of finance and economics, and executive director of the Brevan Howard Centre at Imperial College London. He was the Nippon Life Professor of Finance and Economics at the Wharton School of the University of Pennsylvania. He is most active in the research areas of financial innovations, asset price bubbles, the comparison of financial systems, and financial crises.

== Early life and education ==
He was educated at Merchant Taylors' School, Northwood and Norwich City College. He graduated from the University of East Anglia with a first class bachelor's degree in 1977 and completed his doctorate in economics at Nuffield College, Oxford in 1980.

== Academic career ==
Allen was associate professor of finance and associate professor of finance and economics at the Wharton School from 1980 to 1990, when he became vice dean and director of the Wharton Doctoral Programs and Professor of Finance and Economics. In 1994 he was assigned to the chair of Nippon Life Professor of Finance and Economics as professor. Additionally, he took the position of co-director of the Wharton Financial Institutions Center. He has also visited diverse universities and research centres in the context of visiting professorships, academic fellowships and scientific advisory such as the University of Tokyo (1993), the Johann Wolfgang Goethe-Universität of Francfort (2001, 2006), the Indian School of Business in Hyderabad (2005), the Stockholm School of Economics and University of Gothenburg in Sweden (2006).

In 2014, he joined the faculty of Imperial Business School as the Director of the Brevan Howard Centre. He served as Interim Dean from 2023-2024.

He is a past president of the American Finance Association, Western Finance Association and the Society for Financial Studies, as well as a scientific adviser at the Sveriges Riksbank, the central bank of Sweden. He is the editor of the European Finance Association's flagship journal, the Review of Finance. Besides, he acts as advisor to Fair Observer, an online magazine covering global issues from a plurality of perspectives, on issues concerning finance or economics, but also on future strategy and editorial policy.

Together with Stewart Myers and Richard Brealey, he is the author of Principles of Corporate Finance. The work is a widely prescribed, standard textbook for undergraduate students in corporate finance, and also addresses the needs of practising financial managers.

== Honours ==
In July 2017, Allen was elected a Fellow of the British Academy (FBA), the United Kingdom's national academy for the humanities and social sciences.
