= Joel Stern =

Joel M. Stern (died May 21, 2019) was chairman and chief executive officer of Stern Value Management, formerly Stern Stewart & Co, and the creator and developer of "economic value added". He was a recognised authority on financial economics, corporate performance measurement, corporate valuation and incentive compensation. He was a pioneer and leading advocate of the concept of shareholder value. He was also active in academia, and in the media.

== Family ==
Karen B. Stern was previously married to Joel Stern. Their son, Erik D. Stern, a Brown and Chicago MBA Nobel laureate graduate, became an accomplished C-Suit advisor.

== Career ==
After graduating from the University of Chicago's graduate program in Finance and Economics (MBA, Chicago-Booth, 1964), Stern joined the Chase Manhattan Bank, where he ultimately ran Chase Financial Policy for their global consulting operation. During this time, he developed the concept of free cash flow.

In 1982, after 18 years at Chase Manhattan, he started Stern Stewart & Co with Bennett Stewart. Stern and Stewart revised the existing concept of "residual income" with a large number of accounting adjustments. They named this concept Economic Value Added (EVA) and trademarked it. In their management consulting work during the 1980s and 1990s, they pioneered value-based management (VBM).

Stern wrote multiple books and co-wrote six others, all in financial economics. He served as the executive editor of the Journal of Applied Corporate Finance, and was a member of the editorial board of the Journal of Financial Management and Analysis.

He taught at or served on the adjunct faculties of several graduate business schools in America and abroad, including University of Maryland's Robert H. Smith School of Business, Carnegie Mellon University's Tepper School of Business, University of Chicago (Chicago-Booth), University of Cape Town, Singapore Management University, Universidad Francisco Marroquín, Universidad EAFIT, and Lauder Business School. He was part of the Executive Advisory Committee of the William E. Simon Graduate School of Business Administration at the University of Rochester, and was a member of the University of Chicago's Council on the Graduate School of Business.

His media involvements included being the financial policy columnist for the London Sunday Times and The Financial Times. He also wrote for the Wall Street Journal editorial page, the New York Times and Fortune amongst others. He appeared on national business news programs, including Bloomberg TV’s Taking Stock with Pimm Fox, CNBC Asia’s Squawk Box, CNN’s Moneyline, and Wall Street Week, where he was a rotating panelist for 17 years.

Stern died on May 21, 2019.
