= Internal financing =

In the theory of capital structure, internal financing or self-financing is using its profits or assets of a company or organization as a source of capital to fund a new project or investment. Internal sources of finance contrast with external sources of finance. The main difference between the two is that internal financing refers to the business generating funds from activities and assets that already exist in the company whereas external financing requires the involvement of a third party. Internal financing is generally thought to be less expensive for the firm than external financing because the firm does not have to incur transaction costs to obtain it, nor does it have to pay the taxes associated with paying dividends. Many economists debate whether the availability of internal financing is an important determinant of firm investment or not. A related controversy is whether the fact that internal financing is empirically correlated with investment implies firms are credit constrained and therefore depend on internal financing for investment. Studies show that the availability of funds within a company is a major driver for investment decisions. However, the success and growth of a company is almost entirely dependant on the financial management and the use of internal financing does not explicitly mean success or growth for the firm. The financial manager can use a range of sources including but not limited to retained earnings, the sale of assets, and the reduction and control of working capital to drive expansion and better utilise funds. The availability of internal finance does not have a massive effect on firm growth.

== Internal finance in practice ==
The specific source of internal financing used by a financial manager depends on the industry the firm operates in, the goals of the firm and the restrictions (financial or physical) that are placed on the firm. The sources of internal finance mentioned above can be used in conjunction with one another or individually. The mix of methods that the financial manager would choose also depends on several factors including the goals of the firm, their restrictions and their industry. For example, a retail firm specialising in consumer goods would generally not have as many assets as a car manufacturer. Therefore, the two firms would differ in that the retail firm would rely more on the reduction and control of working capital and retained earnings whereas the car manufacturer would generate more funds through the sale of assets (i.e., plant and equipment).

A big downfall of internal financing revolves around the financial manager and their motives. Financial managers who control large internal sources of finance are more likely to seek investment opportunities that generate lower returns than shareholders can generate for themselves for the purpose of firm growth. Alternatively, managers who source funds externally are monitored closely by the financial market and therefore are inclined to act in the interest of shareholders.

== Advantages ==
- By using internal sources of finance, the financial manager helps the company maintain ownership and control. If the company were to alternatively issue new shares to raise funds, they would be forfeiting a specific amount of control to their shareholders.
- The use of internal financing means no legal obligations to the company and lower costs. Legal obligations are irrelevant in the use of internal financing because the company has no obligation to pay or consult any third party. Costs are less because the cost of borrowing to raise funds through debt financing is eliminated.
- Internal financing helps improve (lower) the debt-to-equity ratio of a company making investments in the company attractive.
- Capital is immediately available
- No control procedures regarding creditworthiness
- No influence of third parties
- More flexibility

== Disadvantages ==
- Internal financing is not ideal for long-term projects or accelerated growth. Internal financing limits a company's ability to borrow funds and therefore their growth is limited by the rate at which they can generate profits.
- Debt financing, a form of external financing, comes with the benefit of tax deductions on the interest payments made by the company. By choosing internal financing the company does not receive any tax benefits.
- The use of internal finance limits a company's ability to expand its network. By limiting the potential expansion of a company's network, they miss out on potential benefits and external expertise
- No increase of capital
- Losses (shrinking of capital) are not tax-deductible
- Limited in volume (volume of external financing as well is limited but there is more capital available outside - in the markets - than inside of a company)

== Retained earnings ==
Retained earnings is the most common source of internal financing for a company. Retained earnings are the profits of a company that are not distributed to shareholders in the form of dividends, but rather are reinvested to fund new projects or ventures. Because retained earnings are reinvested rather than distributed in dividends, the company must insure that the investments they make, or the projects they fund using the earnings, yield a rate of return that is equivalent to or higher than the rate of return that investors can generate by reinvesting those dividends that they could have received, all while maintaining the same level of risk. By failing to do so the financial manager may face adverse effects and risk losing shareholders which would lead to a decrease in company value.

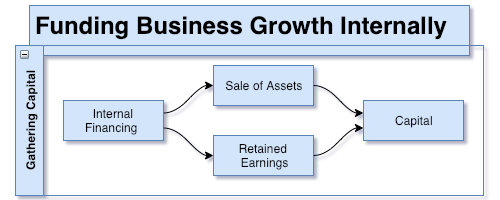
Basic process of internal financing through retained earnings and the sale of assets to generate capital

The reinvestment of earnings helps current shareholders in that it allows them to maintain the value of their shares. By sourcing the funds internally, a company would not need to issue new shares to raise capital through an IPO thus preventing the dilution of current shareholders' share values. Because retained earnings are funds that are already flowing through the company, the firm does not need to wait to receive those funds, meaning they are readily available for use. Companies can do more than just reinvest their earnings or pay them out as dividends. When companies choose to pay out dividends, they only use between 50% and 70% of their earnings, the rest may be utilised elsewhere.

Commonly, most firms rely heavily on internal financing, and retained earnings remains the most prominent form of financing for a firm. Shareholders in a firm are generally happy for retained earnings to be reinvested into the business as long as the projects that the funds are invested in produce a positive NPV. The reason for this is that any projects that are invested in which produce a positive NPV will subsequently increase a shareholders wealth. If internal funds in the form of retained earnings are not enough to cover the cost of an investment then the company faces a financial deficit. In order to overcome this deficit the company would need to cut back on paying dividends in order to increase their retained earnings or alternatively source their funds externally. Studies show that financial managers rely heavily on internal financing because they tend to avoid external financing based on irrational or self-serving fears. For example, by issuing new shares to raise capital the financial manager will be subject to the scrutiny of the financial market and may face awkward questions from potential investors.

== Sale of assets ==
Sale of assets refers to a company selling some or all of its assets in exchange for financial or physical gain. These assets can be tangible (physical), intangible (financial), or a combination of both. The sale of assets is an essential aspect of internal financing and one of the more common sources of financing for a company. The assets which a company can sell are not limited. It is down to the financial manager to strategise and decide what assets are to be sold, physical or financial, and the decision is based on either company growth or downsizing.

The sale of assets, through a theoretical perspective, is viewed as a way to increase asset efficiency or raise capital. By increasing asset efficiency, which is done through asset reallocation, companies can take advantage of economic changes and increase their value. This is different to the sale of assets which serves the purpose of generating capital. Both are valid approaches in which a company can initiate growth.

As the business in itself is an asset, a part of the business can be sold to an investor in exchange for cash. Shares in the company may be sold on the share market. For small businesses, this can be done through the addition of a business partner where an individual pays the business owner a specified amount of money in exchange for a specified degree of control within the business.

The sale of assets can produce short-term and long-term finance dependent on the type of asset sold. The sale of equipment which has become obsolete or is outdated is a source of short-term internal financing. Regular screening of the fixed asset register aids in finding assets which are no longer being used and can be sold, usually at a loss, in order to satisfy financial needs. The sale of more substantial assets such as buildings, land and machinery can be used as a source of long-term internal financing as those assets often produce an increased financial gain. If the business sells off useful assets or assets that are still within their useful life, they can put themselves at a loss as they would no longer receive any benefit from that asset.

== Reduction and control of working capital ==
Reduction and control of working capital both fall under the management of working capital. According to Sagner "Working capital management involves the organisation of a company's short-term resources to sustain on-going activities, mobilise funds, and optimise liquidity." Working capital is a complex concept that can be described as the difference between the current assets of a company and their current liabilities. By managing and controlling working capital the financial manager can reallocate and restructure funds to provide the capital that the company requires from an internal source.

Working Capital is a measure of a firm's ability to meet its short-term financial obligations, the firm's efficiency or lack-off in business operations and short-term financial strength. If current assets outweigh current liabilities, the firm has positive working capital and their ability to invest and grow increases. If current liabilities outweigh current assets, the firm has negative working capital and the ability to invest and grow is decreased along with the ability to pay back debts that are outstanding.

A business can reduce their working capital through the enhancement of receivables and payables accounts. Speeding up the cycle of accounts receivable means the company can generate cash quickly by acquiring cash flows and profits they are set to receive, before they are expected to be collected. Lengthening of accounts payable can aid in the reduction of working capital through delayed payments. This means the business can free up working capital to be used as a source of internal financing by delaying payments relating to the reduction of debt arising from accounts which are payable by the business.

== See also ==
- External financing
- Capital structure
- Self-financing portfolio
