= Richard A. Brealey =

British economist

Richard A. Brealey (born 1936) is a British economist and author. He is an emeritus professor at the London Business School and a Fellow of the British Academy. He co-authored Principles of Corporate Finance with Stewart C. Myers and Franklin Allen (now in its thirteenth edition).

He was formerly Tokai Bank Professor of Finance at London Business School. He has held the posts of Director of the American Finance Association and president of the European Finance Association. He is a member of the editorial boards of the Journal of Applied Corporate Finance, Journal of Empirical Finance, and European Finance Review.

Brealey is a director of the Swiss Helvetia Fund. He was formerly a special adviser to the governor of the Bank of England.

He was educated at Exeter College, Oxford, with an M.A. in Philosophy, Politics and Economics.

== Selected publications ==
=== Books ===
- Principles of Corporate Finance with Stewart C. Myers and Franklin Allen
- Fundamentals of Corporate Finance with Stewart Myers and Alan Marcus

=== Articles and Reports ===
- "The Cost of Capital for the Nor-Ned Cable," by Richard A. Brealey, Richard Caldwell and Carlos Lapuerta, The Brattle Group, Ltd., June 2004.
- "Personal Taxes and the Time Variation of Stock Returns - Evidence from the UK," by Richard A. Brealey, Journal of Banking and Finance, 1999.
- "The Asian Crisis: Lessons for Crisis Management and Prevention," by Richard A. Brealey, Journal of International Finance, 1999.
- "What is the International Dimension of International Finance?," by Richard A. Brealey, I.A. Cooper, and E. Kaplanis, European Finance Review, 1999.
- "Competitive Position of London's Financial Services," by Richard A. Brealey, City Research Project, Final Report, Corporation of London, 1995.
