= Stewart Myers =

American writer and economist

Academic background
- Education: Williams College; Stanford University

Academic work
- Discipline: Economics
- Sub-discipline: Financial Economics
- Institutions: MIT Sloan School of Management

Stewart Clay Myers (born 1940) is the Robert C. Merton professor of financial economics at the MIT Sloan School of Management. He is notable for his work on capital structure and innovations in capital budgeting and valuation, and has had a "remarkable influence" on both the theory and practice of corporate finance. Myers coined the term "real option". He is the co-author with Richard A. Brealey and Franklin Allen of Principles of Corporate Finance, a widely used and cited business school textbook, now in its 11th edition. He is also the author of dozens of research articles.

== Early life ==
Myers holds an A.B. from Williams College and a Ph.D. and MBA from Stanford University.

== Career ==
Myers began teaching at MIT Sloan School of Management in 1966. His contributions are seen as falling into three main categories:

- Work on capital structure, focusing on "debt overhang" and "pecking order theory".
- Contributions to capital budgeting that complement his research on capital structure. He is notable for the adjusted present value (or APV) approach as well as for recognizing the "option-like" character of many corporate assets.
- Work on estimating fair rates of return for public utilities.

Recent projects include the valuation of investments in R&D, risk management, and the allocation of capital in diversified firms, and the theory of corporate governance.

As of 2010, he was a principal of economic consulting firm The Brattle Group. He is a past president of the American Finance Association, a research associate of the National Bureau of Economic Research, and a director of the Cambridge Endowment for Research in Finance.

== Works ==
- Stewart C. Myers (ed) Modern Developments in Financial Management, Dryden Press, 1976, ISBN 9780275341008
- Alexander A. Robichek, Stewart C. Myers, Optimal financing decisions, Prentice-Hall, 1965
- Richard Brealey; Stewart Myers; Franklin Allen; Pitabas Mohanty (1988). Principles of Corporate Finance, 11e. MacGraw-Hill. ISBN 978-93-392-0502-7.
- Richard A. Brealey, Stewart C. Myers, Capital Investment and Valuation, McGraw Hill Professional, 2003, ISBN 9780071383776
