= Loan covenant =

Condition in a commercial loan or bond agreement

A loan covenant is a condition in a commercial loan or bond issue that requires the borrower to fulfill certain conditions or which forbids the borrower from undertaking certain actions, or which possibly restricts certain activities to circumstances when other conditions are met.

Typically, violation of a covenant may result in a default on the loan being declared, penalties being applied, or the loan being called. The legal provision in the loan agreement providing for the loan to be "called" is the "acceleration clause": once the buyer defaults, all future payments due under the loan are "accelerated" and deemed to be due and payable immediately.

Covenants may also be waived, either temporarily or permanently, usually at the sole discretion of the lender.

== Function ==
Covenants are undertakings given by a borrower as part of a term loan agreement. Their purpose is to help the lender ensure that the risk attached to the loan does not unexpectedly deteriorate prior to maturity. From the borrower's point of view covenants often appear to be an obstacle at the time of negotiating a loan and burdensome restriction during its term.

Proponents of the use of covenants, emphasizing the early warning function of covenants, take the case further by arguing that well-designed covenants provide not only timely performance indicators but also open up lines of communication between borrower and lender.

Typical covenants for real estate related loans are the Loan to Value Ratio (LTV), the debt service coverage ratio (DSCR) and Interest Service Coverage Ratio (ISCR).

Covenants can potentially have negative consequences as well. As the creditor is imposing restrictions on how the debtor should conduct business, the debtor's economic freedom is restricted. This may lead to decreased efficiency. When a covenant is broken and additional equity should be contributed, the debtor might not be able to provide it or at least not adequately. This results in making the whole loan due; a resulting fire sale may lead to high write-offs on the debtor's books.

Covenants can be financial, information, ownership, affirmative, negative or positive covenants. Often, the breach of any covenant gives the lender the right to call the loan or collect interest at a higher rate.
