= Noisy market hypothesis =

In finance, the noisy market hypothesis stands in opposition to the efficient-market hypothesis by arguing that security prices do not always reflect a firm’s true underlying value. It suggests that prices can be driven by speculators and momentum traders, as well as by insiders and institutions that trade for reasons unrelated to fundamentals, such as diversification, liquidity needs, or tax considerations. These short-term disturbances, described as "noise" can obscure the true value of securities and may result in mispricing of these securities, potentially for many years.

== See also ==
- Adaptive market hypothesis
- Agent-based computational economics
- Financial economics § Challenges and criticism
- Information cascade
- Noise trader
- Random walk hypothesis § A non-random walk hypothesis
- Grossman-Stiglitz paradox
