= Chi-fu Huang =

Taiwanese businessman, hedge fund manager, and economist

- 黃奇輔
- Born: January 27, 1955 (age 71); Taiwan
- Education: National Taiwan University (BA); Stanford University (PhD)
- Known for: Fixed income relative value investment management; dynamic general equilibrium theory under uncertainty; Optimal consumption and portfolio decisions under uncertainty in continuous time.
- Children: Matt Huang
- Scientific career
- Fields: Financial economics
- Workplaces: Massachusetts Institute of Technology
- Thesis: Essays of financial economics (1982)
- Doctoral advisor: David M. Kreps

Chi-fu Huang (Chinese: 黃奇輔; born January 27, 1955) is a Taiwanese economics professor and former hedge fund manager. During his career, Huang has contributed to the theory of financial economics, having written on dynamic general equilibrium theory, intertemporal utility theory, and the theory of individual consumption and portfolio decisions.

He is also a managing member of CMASH, LLC, a member of the Management Committee of Starling Ventures LLC, a board member of DeepMacro, 9M Technologies, and an owner of numbersgamewines.com. He serves on the advisory board of the Dean of School of Sciences, Massachusetts Institute of Technology.

== Early life and education ==
Huang graduated from National Taiwan University with a Bachelor of Arts (B.A.) in economics in 1977. He then completed doctoral studies in the United States at Stanford University, earning his Ph.D. in financial economics from the Stanford Graduate School of Business in 1983. His doctoral dissertation, "Essays of financial economics," was completed under game theorist and economist David M. Kreps.

== Career ==
After receiving his doctorate, Huang was on the faculty of the MIT Sloan School of Management from 1983 to 1994, and was a full professor holding the J.C. Penney Professorship in Finance when he left MIT in the summer of 1994.

Huang co-founded, with Myron Scholes, Platinum Grove Asset Management L.P. (PGAM), an investment management company based in Rye Brook, New York, in 1999. He was the chief executive officer and Chief Investment Officer of PGAM from 1999 to 2009, and served as Non-Executive Chairman from 2010 to 2013. PGAM was one of the largest fixed income relative value focused hedge funds during the 10 years that Huang served as CEO and CIO.

Before founding PGAM, Huang was with Long Term Capital Management L.P. (LTCM) from 1995 to 1999 and was a Partner and Co-Head of its Asia office in Tokyo from 1997 until 1999. Huang held these positions when, in the wake of the 1997 Asian financial crisis and 1998 Russian Financial Crisis, the fund lost $4.6 billion and was recapitalized by a bailout of $3.6 billion brokered by the Federal Reserve Bank of New York. Huang and Scholes had moved on to PGAM by the time LTCM was dissolved in 2000. Prior to LTCM, he was Head of Fixed Income Derivatives Research at Goldman, Sachs & Co. in New York from 1993 to 1994.

Huang was an editor of Review of Financial Studies and an associate editor of Journal of Economic Theory, Journal of Financial and Quantitative Analysis, Mathematical Finance, and Journal of Mathematical Economics. He is the author of more than 30 articles and is co-author, with Robert H. Litzenberger, of Foundations for Financial Economics (Prentice Hall, 1988. ISBN 0135006538.), a textbook for graduate students in financial markets.

== Research ==
As an academic, his work has been in dynamic general equilibrium theory.

Huang's work on utility theory has allowed researchers to include in their models some intuitively appealing aspects of individual preferences that were previously ignored because they were too difficult to formalize. Additionally, he has expanded the applicability of auction theory to financial markets by studying price behavior in actions conducted by participants who are purchasing items for resale rather than for their own use.
