= Rational herding =

Type of behavior in economic markets

Rational herding refers to situations in which individuals converge on the same behaviour, belief or choice because doing so is the most reasonable response given the information and incentives available to them. In economics and finance, it is a situation in which market participants react to information about the behavior of other market agents or participants rather than the behavior of the market, and the fundamental transactions. The term is distinguished from irrational herding, in which people copy others because of emotional contagion, panic or automatic mimicry, with little regard for the evidence.

Although the concept is prevalent in economics and finance, rational herding sits at the intersection of cognitive psychology, social psychology and behavioural science. It is used to explain a variety of phenomena such as consumer trends, voting behaviour, adoption of medical treatments, academic citation patterns and the spread of information online. Psychological analyses typically treat rational herding as the product of normal cognitive and social processes such as information use, social learning and reputation management rather than a failure of reasoning.

== Herd behaviour in psychology ==
In psychology, herd behaviour describes the tendency of individuals in a group to align their actions, attitudes or emotions with those of others, often without explicit coordination. Classic social psychological demonstrations of this include Asch's conformity experiments, in which participants publicly agreed with clearly incorrect majority judgments. Deutsch and Gerard distinguished two motivations behind such conformity: informational social influence, where others' behaviour is treated as evidence about reality, and normative social influence, where people conform to gain social approval or avoid disapproval.

Rational herding is most closely associated with informational social influence. When individuals face uncertainty and believe that others may possess useful private information, copying the majority can be a rational shortcut rather than blind conformity. This logic is formalised in models of information cascades, in which each person rationally ignores their own private signal because the weight of prior public choices is more informative. The result is that collectively irrational outcomes, such as financial bubbles or fads, can emerge from individually rational, well-intentioned reasoning.

== Related social-learning biases ==
Under the uncertainty of most herding situations, the question of the best option is cognitively demanding, and people often substitute this for the easier question of what others are doing, but this can be prone to error. These errors, or biases, are systematic tendencies that determine whom or what people copy, and can help to explain who becomes influential during rational herding.

- Prestige bias: a disproportionate tendency to copy individuals who are perceived as skilled, knowledgeable or high-status, even in domains unrelated to their expertise. Henrich and Gil-White argue that prestige evolved as a mechanism for cheaply identifying good models of social learning. In practicality, prestige bias helps explain why celebrity endorsements, citation patterns and the visibility of high-profile professionals can be a factor in collective choices.
- Success bias: a preference for copying individuals who display observable markers of success, regardless of whether the copied behaviour actually caused that success. Observers judge the causal relevance of a behaviour by how well it fits the stereotype of a "successful" person, rather than by base rates of outcomes. In investment and consumer contexts, success bias can fuel rational herding into assets, firms or products with visible winners.
- Confirmation bias: the tendency to seek and weigh evidence consistent with existing beliefs, which can cause people to interpret the herd's behaviour as further confirmation of their own initial leaning, increasing the speed with which information cascades form.

Although not a bias, reputational concerns are also a factor as to why rational imitation is used as a strategy. Professionals such as fund managers and analysts may rationally mimic peers because being wrong with the crowd is less damaging to one's career than being wrong alone, a pattern sometimes known as reputational herding.

== Explanations and mechanisms ==
Rational herding is supported by several cognitive processes that operate in the moment of decision-making. When faced with uncertainty, people rely on heuristics such as the availability heuristic (judging likelihood of an event by the ease of recall) and social proof (using others' behaviour as a guide for personal behaviour), to make copying feel justified. Neuroimaging studies have linked conformity-related decision-making to activity in the ventral striatum and medial prefrontal cortex, regions also implicated in reward learning, suggesting that aligning with others is partly driven by anticipated social and informational rewards.

Cognitive mechanisms of this kind are thought to have been shaped by a long evolutionary history of social living. Humans are a social species whose survival and reproduction have long depended on cumulative cultural learning. Evolutionary and cultural-evolutionary explanations argue that selective pressures favoured individuals who could efficiently extract information from the behaviour of successful others, rather than relying solely on costly individual trial-and-error learning. With this view, rational herding is an expected by-product of adaptive social learning strategies. Rules of thumb such as "copy the majority" or "copy the successful" are favoured because they tend to, on average, yield better outcomes than learning from scratch.

== Rational herding in financial contexts ==
An account cited that rational herding is an unintended consequence of the string of Federal Reserve interventions that mandated greater transparency of others' trade activities starting in 2007. Due to crisis environment and uncertainty in the market fundamentals, investors started to use the Federal Reserve's information found in its policy pronouncements.

Rational herding in financial markets can take place because some investors believe others to be better informed than themselves, and follow them, disregarding their own information or market fundamentals. This is based on the idea that if information is costly for an uninformed actor, his ignorance is rational and that, if he cannot afford the information, there is a potential benefit of following another player who can pay for such information.

Reliance on rational herding can be a source of instability in financial markets. There are also scholars who note that rational herding is still based on anecdotal observations and that there is lack of empirical evidence due to the way the so-called "herding literature" focuses on the price or investment patterns, information that is readily available.

== Implications ==
Rational herding has clear implications beyond finance. In public health, patients and clinicians may rationally defer to established treatment norms in the presence of uncertainty, which can accelerate the adoption of genuinely effective practices but can also further deepen the influence of ineffective or less optimal ones. In digital environments, algorithmic recommendation systems and visible engagement metrics (likes, views, ratings) act as strong public signals that readers use as shortcuts, potentially intensifying cascades online. Understanding rational herding therefore matters both for predicting aggregate behaviour and for designing environments that preserve the benefits of social learning while limiting its costs.
