= Peter Bossaerts =

American economist

Peter L. Bossaerts (10 January 1960 in Antwerp, Belgium) is a Belgian-American economist. He is considered one of the pioneers and leading researchers in neuroeconomics and experimental finance. He is Professor of Neuroeconomics at the University of Cambridge and a fellow at Robinson College.

== Life ==
Bossaerts grew up in Belgium and studied at the Universitaire Faculteiten Sint-Ignatius Antwerpen (today University of Antwerp) from 1977 to 1982, where he obtained a Licenciate (Bachelor) and Doctorandus (Master) in applied economics. After coursework towards a PhD in statistics at the Vrije Universiteit Brussel, he earned a Ph.D. at University of California in Financial Economics under the supervision of Richard Roll.

He began his academic career as a research associate at Carnegie Mellon University, then worked as an assistant professor in finance from 1986 to 1990. He joined the California Institute of Technology (Caltech) in 1990 as an assistant professor and became an associate professor in 1994, full professor in 1998, William D. Hacker Professor of Economics and Management in 2003, before being appointed as Dean ("Division Chair") of the Humanities and Social Sciences. From 2007 to 2009, he was Swiss Finance Institute professor at the Swiss Federal Institute of Technology, Lausanne (EPFL). In 2013, he moved from Caltech to the Eccles School of Business of the University of Utah, and in 2016 on to the University of Melbourne (Australia), where he was professor in experimental finance and decision neuroscience, and was awarded a Redmond Barry Distinguished Professorship. He was co-head of the Brain, Mind and Markets Laboratory and was Honorary Professor at the Florey Institute of Neuroscience and Mental Health. In 2022, he moved to the University of Cambridge, UK, where he is now the Leverhulme International Professor of Neuroeconomics at the Faculty of Economics.

Bossaerts is an elected Fellow of the Econometric Society, the Society for the Advancement of Economic Theory, and the Academy of the Social Sciences in Australia. He was president of the Society for Neuroeconomics and the Society for Experimental Finance.

He has published numerous scientific articles in well-known field journals such as Econometrica, Journal of Political Economy, Journal of Finance, Review of Financial Studies, Neuron, Journal of Neuroscience, Econometric Theory, Mathematical Finance, as well as general science journals such as Science and Proceedings of the National Academy of Sciences. He summarised his earlier research on asset pricing and experimental finance in the 2002 book "The Paradox of Asset Pricing".

He is the father of two children.

== Research ==
Bossaerts is one of the pioneers of experimental finance, which is the use of controlled experiments to test theories in finance and designs for better allocation of risks and/or aggregation of information. He advanced the approach to test the core dynamic model used in finance, macro-economics and central banking to understand the link between asset prices, aggregate income, aggregate consumption, and business cycles (the "Lucas" model). This allowed him to test some of the major models of asset pricing (CAPM, Lucas Model or DGSE) that are used widely throughout academia, industry and government, in teaching, analysis of historical data from the field, and in setting policy and regulation. This allowed him also to try novel market designs, such as combinatorial double auctions, to improve allocation of risk, as well as to initiate a unique program on research and teaching of algorithmic (automated; robot) trading.

Bossaerts pioneered neuroeconomics, where decision theory and game theory is brought to bear on interpreting computational signals in the brain. This has led to the emergence of the new fields of decision neuroscience and computational neuropsychiatry. In the past, his work has focused on decision making under uncertainty, where uncertainty is understood as in probability theory. Recently, he has been studying uncertainty that is generated by computational complexity.
