= Herd behavior (economics) =

Herd behavior in economic decisions

In economics, herd behavior is commonly observed in stock market and marketing.

== Economic bubbles ==
Large stock market trends often begin and end with periods of frenzied buying (bubbles) or selling (crashes). Many observers cite these episodes as clear examples of herding behavior that is irrational and driven by emotion—greed in the bubbles, fear in the crashes. Individual investors join the crowd of others in a rush to get in or out of the market.

Some followers of the technical analysis school of investing see the herding behavior of investors as an example of extreme market sentiment. The academic study of behavioral finance has identified herding in the collective irrationality of investors, particularly the work of Nobel laureates Vernon L. Smith, Amos Tversky, Daniel Kahneman, and Robert Shiller.^{[a]} Hey and Morone (2004) analyzed a model of herd behavior in a market context.

Some empirical works on methods for detecting and measuring the extent of herding include Christie and Huang (1995) and Chang, Cheng and Khorana (2000). These results refer to a market with a well-defined fundamental value. A notable incident of possible herding is the 2007 uranium bubble, which started with flooding of the Cigar Lake Mine in Saskatchewan, during the year 2006.

More generally, an economic bubble ("speculative bubble", "asset bubble", "financial bubble") is a period when current asset prices greatly exceed their intrinsic valuation, being the valuation that the underlying long-term fundamentals justify. The rapid spread of information through modern media and social networks can accelerate the formation of asset bubbles. Optimistic narratives, success stories, and price movements can be amplified quickly, reinforcing herd behavior and increasing fear of missing out (FOMO). This fast circulation of information can intensify speculative activity and cause asset prices to rise more rapidly than would be possible through traditional channels alone.

Herding may contribute to financial crisis, even if investors believe they are acting fully rationally basing on available information, see Financial crisis § Herding models and learning models.

== Economic theory of herding ==
There are two strands of work in economic theory that consider why herding occurs and provide frameworks for examining its causes and consequences.

The first of these strands is that on herd behavior in a non-market context. The seminal references are Banerjee (1992) and Bikhchandani, Hirshleifer and Welch (1992), both of which showed that herd behavior may result from private information not publicly shared. More specifically, both of these papers showed that individuals, acting sequentially on the basis of private information and public knowledge about the behavior of others, may end up choosing the socially undesirable option. A large subsequent literature has examined the causes and consequences of such "herds" and information cascades.

The second strands concerns information aggregation in market contexts. An early reference is the classic paper by Grossman and Stiglitz (1976) that showed that uninformed traders in a market context can become informed through the price in such a way that private information is aggregated correctly and efficiently. Subsequent work has shown that markets may systematically overweight public information; it has also studied the role of strategic trading as an obstacle to efficient information aggregation.

== Brand and product success ==
Communications technologies have contributed to the proliferation to consumer choice and "the power of crowds", Consumers increasingly have more access to opinions and information from both opinion leaders and formers on platforms that have largely user-generated content, and thus have more tools with which to complete any decision-making process. Popularity is seen as an indication of better quality, and consumers will use the opinions of others posted on these platforms as a powerful compass to guide them towards products and brands that align with their preconceptions and the decisions of others in their peer groups. Taking into account differences in needs and their position in the socialization process, Lessig & Park examined groups of students and housewives and the influence that these reference groups have on one another. By way of herd mentality, students tended to encourage each other towards beer, hamburger and cigarettes, whilst housewives tended to encourage each other towards furniture and detergent. Whilst this particular study was done in 1977, one cannot discount its findings in today's society. A study done by Burke, Leykin, Li and Zhang in 2014 on the social influence on shopper behavior shows that shoppers are influenced by direct interactions with companions, and as a group size grows, herd behavior becomes more apparent. Discussions that create excitement and interest have greater impact on touch frequency and purchase likelihood grows with greater involvement caused by a large group. Shoppers in this Midwestern American shopping outlet were monitored and their purchases noted, and it was found up to a point, potential customers preferred to be in stores which had moderate levels of traffic. The other people in the store not only served as company, but also provided an inference point on which potential customers could model their behavior and make purchase decisions, as with any reference group or community.

Social media can be a powerful tool in perpetuating herd behavior. Its immeasurable amount of user-generated content serves as a platform for opinion leaders to take the stage and influence purchase decisions, and recommendations from peers and evidence of positive online experience all serve to help consumers make purchasing decisions. Gunawan and Huarng's 2015 study concluded that social influence is essential in framing attitudes towards brands, which in turn leads to purchase intention. Influencers form norms which their peers are found to follow, and targeting extroverted personalities increases chances of purchase even further. This is because the stronger personalities tend to be more engaged on consumer platforms and thus spread word of mouth information more efficiently.

== See also ==
- Herd mentality
