= Herd mentality =

Tendency to adopt group beliefs and behaviors

Herd mentality is the tendency for people's behavior or beliefs to conform to those of the group they belong to. The concept of herd mentality has been studied and analyzed from different perspectives, including biology, psychology, and sociology. This psychological phenomenon can have profound impacts on human behavior.

Social psychologists study the related topics of collective intelligence, crowd wisdom, groupthink, and deindividuation.

== History ==
The social psychologists Gabriel Tarde (1843-1904) and Gustave Le Bon (1841-1931) first put forward the idea of a "group mind" or "mob behavior" in the 19th century. Herd behavior in human societies has also been studied by Sigmund Freud and by Wilfred Trotter, whose 1916 book Instincts of the Herd in Peace and War became a classic in the field of social psychology. Sociologist and economist Thorstein Veblen's The Theory of the Leisure Class (1899) illustrates how individuals imitate other group members of higher social status in their consumer behavior. More recently, Canadian journalist Malcolm Gladwell in The Tipping Point (2000), examines how cultural, social, and economic factors converge to create trends in consumer behavior. In 2004, the New Yorker's financial columnist James Surowiecki published The Wisdom of Crowds.

In the 21st century academic studies of marketing and of behavioral finance attempt to identify and predict the rational and irrational behavior of investors. (See the work of Daniel Kahneman, Robert Shiller, Vernon L. Smith, and Amos Tversky.) Driven by emotional reactions such as greed and fear, investors may join in frantic purchasing and sales of stocks, potentially causing bubbles and crashes. As a result, behavioral-finance experts study herd behavior closely with a view to help predict future economic crises.

== Research ==
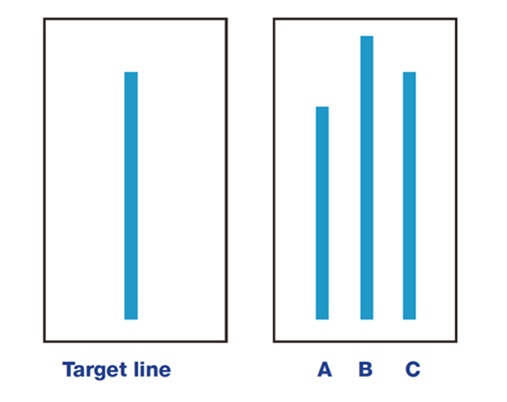
Participants had to state which line (A, B, or C) was most similar to the target line out loud.

The Asch conformity experiments involved a series of studies directed by American psychologist Solomon Asch to measure the effect of majority opinion on individuals. In his first study, Asch recruited fifty male students from Swarthmore College to take a "vision test" with a line judgement task. The students were asked which of three lines was the same length as a target line. The task was designed to be easy, with no ambiguity about the correct response. However, each student (the "naive" participant) was joined by six to eight confederates (i.e. actors) who had agreed in advance to match their responses. The participant was not aware of this agreement. Groups viewed 18 trials, with the confederates purposefully and unanimously giving the incorrect answer on 12 of them. During these 12 "critical" trials, naive participants responded with the correct answer 68% of the time but agreed, incorrectly, with confederates 32% of the time. Thirteen of the fifty naive participants (26%) never gave an incorrect answer. Asch compared these results to those of a control group who responded alone, with no confederates present. Control group participants responded correctly more than 99% of the time. After further research with more participants, Asch published results in which naive participants responded correctly 63% of the time and incorrectly 37% of the time, with 24% responding correctly on every trial and 5% agreeing with the incorrect confederates on every trial.

Researchers at Leeds University performed a group experiment in which volunteers were told to randomly walk around a large hall without talking to each other. A select few were then given more detailed instructions on where to walk. The scientists discovered that people end up blindly following one or two instructed people who appear to know where they are going. The results of this experiment showed that it only takes 5% of confident looking and instructed people to influence the direction of the other 95% of people in the crowd, and the 200 volunteers did this without even realizing it.

Researchers from Hebrew University, NYU, and MIT explored herd mentality in online spaces, specifically in the context of "digitized, aggregated opinions". Online comments were given an initial positive or negative vote (up or down) on an undisclosed website over five months. The control group comments were left alone.

The researchers found that "the first person reading the comment was 32% more likely to upvote it if it had been already given a fake positive score". Over the five months, comments artificially rated positively showed a 25% higher average score than the control group, with the initial negative vote ending up with no statistical significance in comparison to the control group. The researchers found that "prior ratings created significant bias in individual rating behavior, and positive and negative social influences created asymmetric herding effects".

"That is a significant change", Dr. Aral, one of the researchers involved in the experiment, stated. "We saw how these very small signals of social influence snowballed into behaviors like herding."

== Theories ==
=== Evolution ===
Evidence of herd behavior in animals, especially in monkeys (humankind's close relatives) suggests that herd mentality has evolutionary roots. Evidence shows that animals acquire information to make important decisions (i.e. deciding where to forage and assessing mating potential) by monitoring the interactions of others with their environment. For instance, imitation in monkeys is the most effective strategy of rapidly transmitting information throughout the species. Accumulating evidence and statistical hypotheses framework developed using a Markov chain approach has shown that the joint exploitation of one source will give more benefit to the group than an even distribution of effort over two different sources. In humans, evidence suggests that conformity is the product of both informational and normative influences, where the latter refers to receptivity to intra-group social pressures. Social scientists have regarded this as an important evolutionary instinct which encourages socially constructive empathy and altruism, helpful in overcoming conflict. The advantages conferred to herd behavior has led to it shaping human evolution, consistent with Charles Darwin's theory of natural selection.

=== Neuroscience ===
Herd behavior can also be illuminated by neuroscience. Recent developments in neuroscience suggest that our tendency to "imitate" might be due to a system of "mirror neurons" in our brains. In an experiment that recorded electrical activity in the brain of a macaque, it was found that the same neurons fired both when the monkey acted and when the monkey observed the same action performed by the other. The neuron "mirrored" the motor behavior of the other, as though the observer was executing the motor act. It is hypothesized that there is a similar "mirror neuron" network that exists in human brains but has yet to be proven because of the ethical considerations surrounding experimentation.

Another neuroscientific phenomenon which results in the primitive, automatic, and unconscious process of social mimicry is emotional contagion. When a receiver of information interacts with its sender, the receiver perceives the emotional expressions of the sender and automatically transfers the emotional expressions to his/her bodily expressions. Through the process of afferent feedback, the copied bodily expressions result in the receiver experiencing the same emotions as the sender. This leads to an emotional convergence and mimicry behavior. This theory is reinforced by a study that has shown that herd-decisions are associated with shorter decision-making times, suggesting that herding is an intrinsic, emotional response and a more automatic decision-making heuristic.

Neuroscientific analysis of economic games suggests that social rewards trigger a "bliss response", through the release of the neurochemical, oxytocin. Importantly, activations are pronounced where cooperation is reciprocated. This creates a positive feedback loop, where the brain triggers social behavior to release a "bliss response".

=== Psychology ===
"Docility", or receptivity to social norms is a fundamental characteristic that underlies herd behavior. Research done on cognitive psychology has shown that humans differ from other species in the development of social norms and mutually shared expectations which inform them about what actions are normal, appropriate or just given any situation. The Asch experiment where subjects conformed to the erroneous majority view, has shown that the human mind is built to be receptive to social norms and self-censor actions in advance to avoid deviations from the norm. "Docility" is also created by the human response to narratives and stories, by which most information is conveyed, which influences people to view, interpret and see things from a shared viewpoint.

Experimental evidence has shown that there exists a correlation between risk aversion and herding behavior. People tend to avoid risk and conform to the status quo as they believe that others' information is more reliable and strength in numbers minimizes uncertainties. For instance, consumers on online platforms perceive popular products as the ones with superior quality.

=== Sociology ===
A study by George Katona established that there were two primary methods of group-learning: (1) the "stamping-in" of simple rules-of-thumb and heuristics and (2) learning that occurs via problem solving and understanding. Imitating behavior of a social group to learn falls under the former as it relies on observations of others as opposed to individual experience. This provides a "fast and frugal heuristic approach to learning" in social situations and a path of least resistance, which humans gravitate towards.

Additionally, in a world where social perception is an inherent determinant of social status, it seems rational to submit to majority pressure. The desire to strongly identify with the group could thus spur people to abandon their own judgements and imitate the actions of others within the group.

== In modern society ==
While in some situations, adopting the herd mentality can be a beneficial survival strategy, herd behavior has not been well-adapted for modern "artificial" contexts and can lead to negative consequences.

Trading in financial markets is characterized by herd behavior to a large extent. In times of market uncertainty, fear response drives investors to imitate what other investors are doing without conducting their own analysis to mitigate the risk of failure. Economist John Maynard Keynes states that "worldly wisdom teaches that it is better for reputation to fail conventionally than to succeed unconventionally". Unjustified runs on foreign exchange currencies and stock market bubbles are usually attributable to herding behavior. At other times, individuals benefit from the "information cascade" by herding to piece together incomplete information about the market. Nonetheless, the arbitrary nature of decision-making in the financial markets based on herding can generate large-scale instability.

Herd mentality can be harnessed as a useful tool in marketing (i.e. influencers and reviews) as studies have found that shoppers are more inclined to purchase a product when their attitude is framed by others' influence and that herd mentality becomes more apparent as the group size grows.

Nonetheless, herd behavior on social media can also create dangerous echo chambers and lead to the polarization of society. When people do not challenge the status quo or express dissenting opinions, it might create an echo-chamber environment where a person only encounters information that reflects and reinforces their own. Where members of a societal group adopt homogenous opinions, it amplifies the group's collective beliefs and might result in the marginalization of minority viewpoints and a potential for group members to prioritize consensus over rational decision-making (known as "groupthink").

== See also ==
- Anonymity
- Argumentum ad populum
- Bandwagon effect
- Cancel culture
- Collectivism
- Conformity
- Crowd abuse
- Crowd psychology
- Folie à deux
- Groupthink
- Herd behavior
- Herd behavior in economics
- Mass psychogenic illness
- Peer pressure
- Sheeple
- Slave morality

Philosophers

- Søren Kierkegaard
- Erik von Kuehnelt-Leddihn
- Friedrich Nietzsche
- José Ortega y Gasset
- Everett Dean Martin
