= Ivo Welch =

German economist

- Born: October 4, 1963 (age 62); Schweinfurt, West Germany
- Education: University of Chicago, PhD 1991; University of Chicago, MBA 1988; Columbia University, BA 1985
- Known for: Financial economics Informational Cascades
- Scientific career
- Fields: Economist
- Workplaces: UCLA 2011- Brown University 2004-2011; Yale University 2000-2005; UCLA 1989-2000
- Doctoral advisor: Milton Harris (thesis advisor)

Ivo Welch is a German-born economist and finance academic, the J. Fred Weston Professor of Finance at UCLA Anderson School of Management.

His research, widely cited, (Note: He ranked about 50th by downloads on SSRN, in 2014, but has since slipped to 100th (by 2021), both by downloads and by cites. In 2006, he ranked 54th on the Web of Science list of "Most-Cited Scientists in Economics & Business"; in 2007 (the last year of the rankings), he ranked 57th. On Google Scholar, his work had gathered about 53,000 cites in 2024, increasing by about 2,800 cites per year thereafter. In the German Handelsblatt VWL Rankings of economists with German background 2019, his life work was ranked second (behind Roman Inderst) for finance professors and sixth among all economics professor.) has focused on financial economics and informational cascades. In addition to more than 50 journal articles, his works include a Corporate Finance textbook, (latterly self-published) as well as items in the popular press.

Welch is an National Bureau of Economic Research (NBER) Research Associate, and has been editor of the Critical Finance Review since inception. He is a two-time recipient of the Michael Brennan Award, and a Humboldt Foundation 2015 fellow. He was previously on the faculties of the Yale School of Management (Professor of Economics and Finance) and Brown University's economics department (Professor of Financial Economics).

Welch completed his BA in computer science in 1985 at Columbia University, and both his MBA and PhD in finance at the University of Chicago.
