= Antonio Mele =

Italian economist (born 1967)

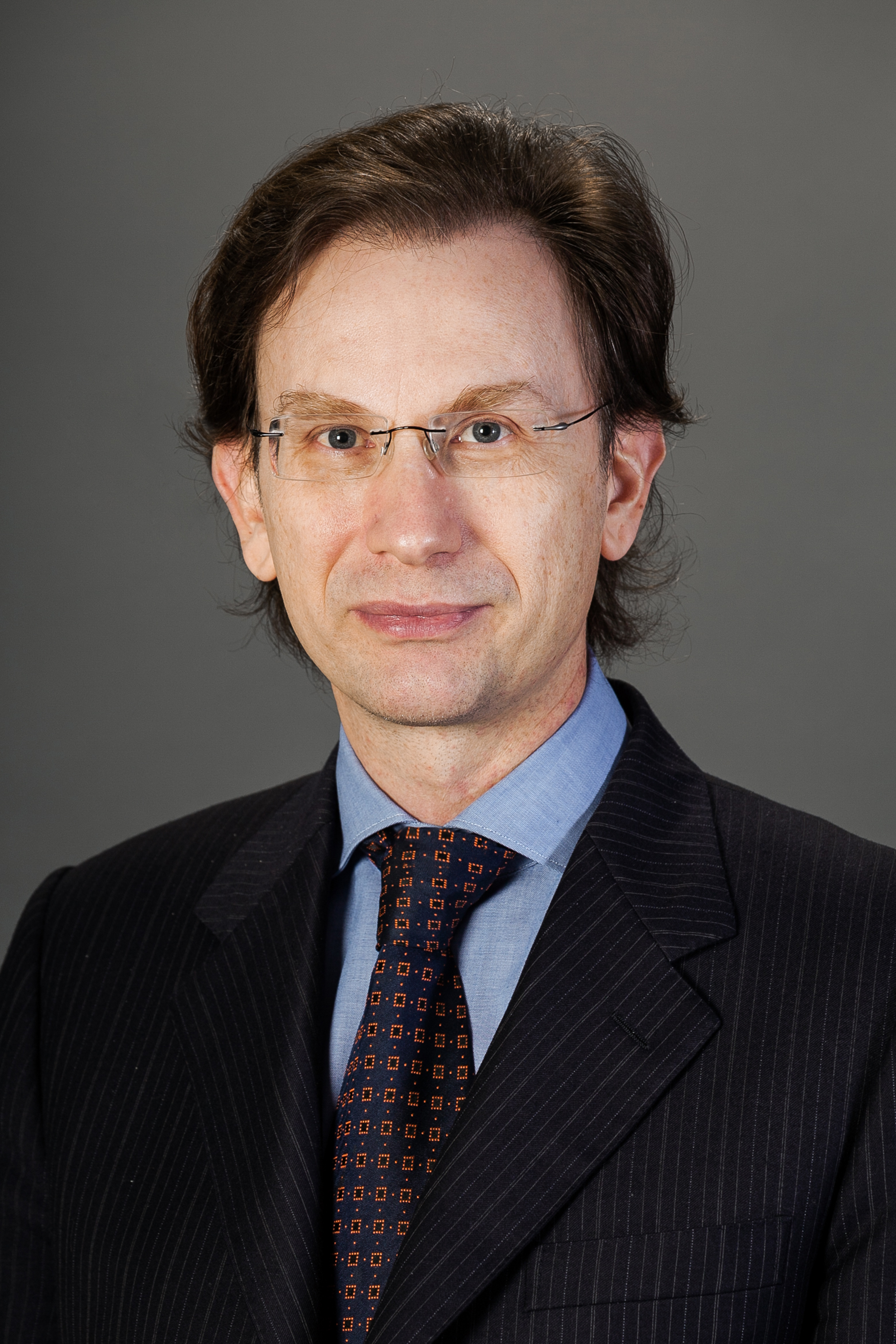
- Born: 22 March 1967 (age 59); Rome, Italy

Academic work
- Discipline: Financial Economics
- Institutions: Professor of Finance at Università della Svizzera Italiana and Swiss Finance Institute

Antonio Mele (born 22 March 1967, Rome, Italy) is an Italian economist.

He is currently Professor of Finance at USI (Università della Svizzera Italiana) and at the Swiss Finance Institute after a decade with the London School of Economics and Political Science.

He is the author of several works on uncertainty and volatility in financial markets, the interlinks between financial markets and business cycles, and financial market microstructure.

Some of his work has led to real-time indicators of uncertainty in fixed income markets that are maintained by Chicago Board Options Exchange and new instruments to hedge volatility of interest rates and credit spreads.

== Biography ==
=== Studies and career ===
After completing his studies at Scuola Militare Nunziatella in Naples (1983–1986), he graduated in Economics at LUISS University in Rome (1991), and obtained his PhD in Economics at University of Paris X (1995) with a thesis in mathematical economics and econometrics on the volatility of financial markets. In 1996, he became Professor of Economics in France after the national competitive examination ("Concours national d'Agrégation des Universités en Sciences Économiques"). He has been professor at the Université du Littoral (1996–2001), and continued his career at Queen Mary University of London (2001–2002), University of Turin (2007–2008), and the London School of Economics and Political Science (2002–2012), and in 2011 joined USI (Università della Svizzera Italiana) with a chair promoted by the Ticino Banking Association ("Associazione Bancaria Ticinese") and a Senior Chair of the Swiss Finance Institute. He is a Research Fellow in the Financial Economics programme at CEPR (Centre for Economic Policy Research) in London.

He has been Visiting Fellow in the Department of Economics of Princeton University (2000), Visiting Professor in the Department of Economics of Toulouse University (2006) and in the Departments of Finance of the National University of Singapore (2010), Imperial College London (2013), Luxembourg School of Finance (2017, 2018) and London Business School (2018), and Visiting Fellow in the economics and research departments of the European Central Bank (2005, 2008) and the Swiss National Bank (2009).

During the 2010s, he created QUASaR (Quantitative Strategies and Research), a startup that has collaborated with Chicago Board Options Exchange for the purpose of creating new instruments to hedge volatility in the US fixed income markets. Between 2015 and 2017, he acted as a member of the Securities and Markets Stakeholder Group of the European Securities Markets Authority (ESMA).

=== Academic work ===
His work focusses on problems related to uncertainty and volatility in financial markets and the interlinks with macroeconomic developments. Financial volatility measures the amplitude of asset price fluctuations, and tends to widen during periods of high uncertainty. His work aims at clarifying the origins of this volatility, the interactions of financial market volatility with the business cycle, and the design of new indicators of uncertainty in the large fixed income markets.

During the second half of the 2000s, he elaborated one of the first equilibrium models of financial markets with asymmetric information in the presence of networks amongst agents.

He is the author of a book of about 1,300 pages devoted to a synthesis of knowledge in Financial Economics.

=== Contributions to the industry ===
Since the early 2010s, he has advised Chicago Board Options Exchange (CBOE) on the creation of a suite of indexes of expected volatility in various segments of the fixed income markets.

He contributed to the development of the S&P/JPX JGB VIX Index.

== Publications ==
=== Books ===
- Financial Economics. MIT Press (2022), 1,288 pages.
- The Price of Fixed Income Market Volatility (2015). New York: Springer Verlag (Springer Finance Series), 250 pages (with Yoshiki Obayashi).
- Stochastic Volatility in Financial Markets (2000). New York: Springer Verlag (original ed.: Kluwer Academic Publishers), 145 pages (with Fabio Fornari).
- Dynamiques non linéaires, volatilité et équilibre (1998). Paris: Editions Economica, 212 pages.

=== Main articles ===
- "Uncertainty, Information Acquisition and Price Swings in Asset Markets" (2015). Review of Economic Studies 82, 1533-1567 (with Francesco Sangiorgi).
- "Macroeconomic Determinants of Stock Volatility and Volatility Premiums" (2013). Journal of Monetary Economics 60, 203-220 (with Valentina Corradi e Walter Distaso).
- "Adding and Subtracting Black-Scholes: A New Approach to Approximating Derivative Prices in Continuous-Time Models" (2011). Journal of Financial Economics 102, 390-415 (with Dennis Kristensen).
- "Information Linkages and Correlated Trading" (2010). Review of Financial Studies 23, 203-246 (with Paolo Colla).
- "Simulated Nonparametric Estimation of Dynamic Models" (2009). Review of Economic Studies 76, 413-450 (with Filippo Altissimo).
- "Asymmetric Stock Market Volatility and the Cyclical Behavior of Expected Returns" (2007). Journal of Financial Economics 86, 446–478.
- "Fundamental Properties of Bond Prices in Models of the Short-Term Rate" (2003). Review of Financial Studies 16, 679–716.
