= George Pennacchi =

American economist

George Pennacchi is an economist and finance academic, currently the Bailey Memorial Chair of Finance at Gies College of Business, University of Illinois. His research interests include financial institutions, derivative securities, and bond markets; he has over 30 papers published. He received his Sc.B. in applied mathematics from Brown University and his Ph.D. in economics from the Massachusetts Institute of Technology.
