= Noise trader =

Stock trader who uses economic noise

A noise trader is a stock trader whose decisions to buy or sell are based on "factors they believe to be helpful but in reality will give them no better returns than random choices". These factors may include hype or rumor, which noise traders believe to be reliable signals of future returns, but which are actually forms of economic noise that cannot be used to accurately predict the future value of a stock.

Noise traders do not trade randomly; their decisions are systematic. However, their trading decisions are not based on professional advice or a business's fundamentals, and the purported signals used by noise traders are more unreliable than those used by technical analysts. Therefore, returns on their trading decisions are expected to be no better than random choices.

== Behavioural characteristics ==
Noise traders are often described as emotion-driven, impulsive and prone to herding. Studies of individual investors find that they tend to buy attention-grabbing stocks, those in the news or with extreme recent returns, rather than acting on fundamentals. Herding, whereby investors imitate one another through informational cascades or reputational pressure, reinforces these patterns.

== See also ==
- Noisy market hypothesis
- Excess volatility puzzle
- Quantitative analyst
- Behavioral economics
