= Grossman–Stiglitz paradox =

Economic paradox on market efficiency

The Grossman–Stiglitz Paradox is a paradox introduced by Sanford J. Grossman and Joseph Stiglitz in a joint publication in American Economic Review in 1980 that argues perfectly informationally efficient markets are an impossibility since, if prices perfectly reflected available information, there is no profit to gathering information, in which case there would be little reason to trade and markets would eventually collapse.

== Rational efficient markets formulation ==
The rational efficient markets formulation recognizes that investors will not rationally incur the expenses of gathering information unless they expect to be rewarded by higher gross returns compared with the free alternative of accepting the market price. Furthermore, modern theorists recognize that when intrinsic value is difficult to determine, as is the case of common stock, and when trading costs exist, even further room exists for price to diverge from value.

A corollary is that investors who purchase index funds or ETFs are benefitting at the expense of investors who pay for the services of financial advisors, either directly or indirectly through the purchase of actively managed funds.

== See also ==
- Noise (economic)
