= John Donaldson (economist) =

American economist

John B. Donaldson (born 1948) is an American economist and presently the Mario J. Gabelli Professor of Finance at Columbia Business School. His interests are in business and finance options, its asset pricing, business cycles and especially real economic impact on equilibrium prices. He has published his work in Econometrica, Journal of Economic Dynamics and Control, International Economic Review, Journal of Economic Theory, Journal of Monetary Economics, Quarterly Journal of Economics, Review of Economic Dynamics, and Review of Economic Studies.

== Education and early career ==
Donaldson earned his B.S. in mathematics at Lafayette College in 1970, and his M.S. in mathematics, in 1972, and his M.S. in economics in 1974, his Ph.D. in 1976, all three at Carnegie Mellon University. He joined Columbia University in 1977.

== Work and publications ==
Donaldson has been consistently cited in the last 10 years for his publications, and his highest cited paper is "Junior can't borrow: A new perspective on the equity premium puzzle" at 552 times, according to Google Scholar.

- “Stochastic Properties of Fast vs . Slow Growth Economies, (with J.P. Danthine), Econometrica, 49 (1981), 1007-1033. Reprinted in “Growth Theory” edited by R. Becker and E. Burmeister, volume III of the International Library of Critical Writings in Economics, Edward Elgar Publishing Ltd., Cheltenham 1989.
- “Certainty Planning in an Uncertain World: A Reconsideration,” (with J.P. Danthine), Review of Economic Studies, 48 (1981), 507–510.
- “Labour relations and asset returns,” (with J.P. Danthine), Review of Economic Studies, 69 (2002), 41–64.
- “Methodological and empirical issues in real business cycle theory,” (with J.P. Danthine), Review of Economic Studies, 69 (2002), 41–64.
- “Efficiency wages and the business cycle puzzle,” (with J.P. Danthine), European Economic Review, 34 (1990), 1275–1301.
- “Inflation and asset prices in an exchange economy,” (with J.P. Danthine), Econometrica, (1986), 585–605.
- “The structure of intertemporal preferences under uncertainty and time consistent plans,” (with T.H. Johnsen), Econometrica, (1985), 1451–1458.
- “Comparative dynamics of an equilibrium intertemporal asset pricing model,” (with R. Mehra), Review of Economic Studies, 51 (1984), 491–508.
- “Stochastic properties of fast vs. slow growing economies,” (with J.P. Danthine), Econometrica, (1981), 1007–1033.
