= Robert Litzenberger =

American academic

- Born: Robert Litzenberger; 1943 (age 82–83); New York, New York, U.S.
- Education: Wagner College, Wharton School (MBA), University of North Carolina at Chapel Hill (PhD)
- Occupations: Professor, financial economist, investment banker
- Children: 3

Robert H. Litzenberger (born 1943) is an American financial economist, investment banker, and educator. He is professor emeritus at the Wharton School of the University of Pennsylvania. He is best known for establishing the use of state prices in financial economics.

== Biography ==
Robert H. Litzenberger was born in 1943, in New York City. He studied at Wagner College in Staten Island, New York; before receiving an MBA degree from the Wharton School at the University of Pennsylvania; and a PhD from University of North Carolina at Chapel Hill three years later in 1969.

Litzenberger served on the faculty of Carnegie Mellon University's Graduate school of Industrial Administration (now the Tepper School of Business) for one year. He moved to the Stanford Business School, where he earned tenure and a chaired professorship.

In 1986 he returned to the Wharton School, while taking the part-time position of director of research and chief economist at AIG Financial Products. He used his experience there to develop the first financial engineering course to be offered at Penn.

Litzenberger retired from academia in 1995, taking the emeritus title at the University of Pennsylvania. He became director of derivative research and quantitative modeling at Goldman Sachs. He later served as risk manager in 1998 and became a partner in 1999, shortly before Goldman's IPO. After the attacks on 9/11, Litzenberger stepped back from an active role at Goldman. He is retired, living in rural Pennsylvania with his wife Amy.
