= Herd behavior =

Behavior of groups without centralized direction

Herd behavior is the behavior of individuals in a group acting collectively without centralized direction. The term refers to behavior in animals in herds, packs, bird flocks, fish schools, etc. Voting, demonstrations, riots, general strikes, sporting events, religious gatherings, everyday decision-making, judgement, and opinion-forming may include human herd behavior.

== Early research ==
The philosophers Søren Kierkegaard and Friedrich Nietzsche were among the first to criticize what they referred to as "the crowd" (Kierkegaard) and "herd morality" and the "herd instinct" (Nietzsche) in human society. Modern psychological and economic research has identified herd behavior in humans to explain the phenomenon of large numbers of people acting in the same way at the same time. The British surgeon Wilfred Trotter popularized the "herd behavior" phrase in his book Instincts of the Herd in Peace and War (1914). In The Theory of the Leisure Class, Thorstein Veblen explained economic behavior in terms of social influences such as "emulation", where some members of a group mimic other members of higher status. In "The Metropolis and Mental Life" (1903), early sociologist George Simmel referred to the "impulse to sociability in man", and sought to describe "the forms of association by which a mere sum of separate individuals are made into a 'society' ". Other social scientists explored behaviors related to herding, such as Sigmund Freud (crowd psychology), Carl Jung (collective unconscious), Everett Dean Martin (Behavior of Crowds) and Gustave Le Bon (the popular mind).

Swarm theory observed in non-human societies is a related concept and is being explored as it occurs in human society. Scottish journalist Charles Mackay identifies multiple facets of herd behavior in his 1841 work, Extraordinary Popular Delusions and the Madness of Crowds.

== Everyday decision making ==
"Benign" herding behaviors may occur frequently in everyday decisions based on learning from the information of others, as when a person on the street decides which of two restaurants to dine in. Suppose that both look appealing, but both are empty because it is early evening; at random, this person chooses restaurant A. Soon a couple walks down the same street in search of a place to eat. They see that restaurant A has customers while B is empty, and choose A on the assumption that having customers makes it the better choice. If other passers-by do the same thing during the evening, restaurant A does more business that night than B. This phenomenon is also referred as an information cascade.

== Crowds ==
Crowds that gather to protest about a grievance can involve herding behavior that turns violent, particularly when confronted by an opposing ethnic or racial group. The Los Angeles riots of 1992, New York Draft Riots, and Tulsa race massacre are notorious in U.S. history. The idea of a "group mind" or "mob behavior" was put forward by the French social psychologists Gabriel Tarde and Gustave Le Bon.

== Sheeple ==
Sheeple (/ˈʃiːpəl/; a portmanteau of "sheep" and "people", also spelt sheople) is a derogatory term that highlights the passive herd behavior of people easily controlled by a governing power or market fads by comparing them to sheep, a herd animal that is "easily" led about. The term is used to describe those who voluntarily acquiesce to a suggestion without any significant critical analysis or research, in large part due to the majority of a population having a similar mindset. Word Spy defines it as "people who are meek, easily persuaded, and tend to follow the crowd (sheep + people)". Merriam-Webster defines the term as "people who are docile, compliant, or easily influenced: people likened to sheep". The word is pluralia tantum, which means it does not have a singular form.

The word was used in 1945, by W. R. Anderson in his column Round About Radio, where he wrote:

The simple truth is that you can get away with anything, in government. That covers almost all the evils of the time. Once in, nobody, apparently, can turn you out. The People, as ever (I spell it "Sheeple"), will stand anything.

Another instance of early use was by Ernest Rogers, whose 1949 book The Old Hokum Bucket contained a chapter entitled "We the Sheeple". The Wall Street Journal first reported the label in print in 1984; the reporter heard the word used by the proprietor of the American Opinion bookstore. In this usage, taxpayers were derided for their blind conformity as opposed to those who thought independently. The term was first popularized in the late 1980s and early 1990s by conspiracy theorist and broadcaster Bill Cooper on his radio program The Hour of the Time.

== Economics ==
In economics, herd behavior is commonly observed in stock market and marketing. Large stock market trends often begin and end with periods of frenzied buying (bubbles) or selling (crashes). Many observers cite these episodes as clear examples of herding behavior that is irrational and driven by emotion—greed in the bubbles, fear in the crashes. Individual investors join the crowd of others in a rush to get in or out of the market.

Some followers of the technical analysis school of investing see the herding behavior of investors as an example of extreme market sentiment. The academic study of behavioral finance has identified herding in the collective irrationality of investors, particularly the work of Nobel laureates Vernon L. Smith, Amos Tversky, Daniel Kahneman, and Robert Shiller.^{[a]} Hey and Morone (2004) analyzed a model of herd behavior in a market context.

Herding behavior contributes to brand and product success. Communications technologies have contributed to the proliferation to consumer choice and "the power of crowds", Consumers increasingly have more access to opinions and information from both opinion leaders and formers on platforms that have largely user-generated content, and thus have more tools with which to complete any decision-making process. Popularity is seen as an indication of better quality, and consumers will use the opinions of others posted on these platforms as a powerful compass to guide them towards products and brands that align with their preconceptions and the decisions of others in their peer groups. Herding in retail settings can also arise from consumers using other shoppers' purchases as information about product quality or value. A 2021 study using transaction data from a television shopping network found evidence that shoppers were more likely to purchase when information about prior purchases was displayed. The herding effect was stronger when price discounts were smaller, for products with less readily evaluated attributes, and earlier in a sales presentation when consumers had less information about the product, patterns consistent with rational informational herding. Social media can also be a powerful tool in perpetuating herd behavior.

== Social marketing ==
Marketing can easily transcend commercial roots, in that it can be used to encourage action to do with health, environmentalism and general society. Herd mentality often takes a front seat when it comes to social marketing, paving the way for campaigns such as Earth Day, and the variety of anti-smoking and anti-obesity campaigns seen in every country. Within cultures and communities, marketers must aim to influence opinion leaders who in turn influence each other, as it is the herd mentality of any group of people that ensures a social campaign's success. A campaign run by Som la Pera in Spain to combat teenage obesity found that campaigns run in schools are more effective due to influence of teachers and peers, and students' high visibility, and their interaction with one another. Opinion leaders in schools created the logo and branding for the campaign, built content for social media and led in-school presentations to engage audience interaction. It was thus concluded that the success of the campaign was rooted in the fact that its means of communication was the audience itself, giving the target audience a sense of ownership and empowerment. As mentioned previously, students exert a high level of influence over one another, and by encouraging stronger personalities to lead opinions, the organizers of the campaign were able to secure the attention of other students who identified with the reference group.

Herd behavior not only applies to students in schools where they are highly visible, but also amongst communities where perceived action plays a strong role. Between 2003 and 2004, California State University carried out a study to measure household energy saving, and motivations for it. It was found that factors like saving the environment, saving money and social responsibility did not have as great an impact on each household as the perceived behavior of their neighbors did. Although the financial incentives of saving money, closely followed by moral incentives of protecting the environment, are often thought of as being a community's greatest guiding compass, more households responded to the encouragement to save energy when they were told that 77% of their neighbors were using fans instead of air conditioning, proving that communities are more likely to engage in a behavior if they think that everyone else is already taking part.

Herd behaviors shown in the two examples exemplify that it can be a powerful tool in social marketing, and if harnessed correctly, has the potential to achieve great change. It is clear that opinion leaders and their influence achieve huge reach among their reference groups and thus can be used as the loudest voices to encourage others in any collective direction.

== See also ==
- Argumentum ad populum – Fallacy of claiming the majority is always correct
- Bandwagon effect – Societal phenomenon
- Collective behavior – Sociological theory and Collective animal behavior – Animal cognition
- Collective consciousness – Shared beliefs and ideas in society
- Collective effervescence – Sociological concept coined by Émile Durkheim
- Collective intelligence – Group intelligence that emerges from collective efforts
- Conformity – Matching opinions and behaviors to group norms
- Crowd psychology – Branch of social psychology
- Group dynamics – System of behaviors within or between social groups
- Groupthink – Psychological phenomenon that occurs within a group of people
- Herd mentality – Tendency to adopt group beliefs and behaviors
- Hive mind – Shared beliefs and ideas in society
- Information cascade – Behavioral phenomenon
- Mass psychogenic illness – Spread of illness without organic cause
- Mean world syndrome – Perceiving the world to be more dangerous than it really is
- Moral panic – Fear that some evil threatens society
- Panic buying – Unusual pattern of purchase
- Riot – Violent public disturbance
- Self-organization – Process of forming order by local interactions
- Social proof – Psychological phenomenon regarding conformity
- Speaking truth to power – Non-violent political tactic employed by dissidents
- Spontaneous order – Theory of economy and sociology
- Stampede – Panicked running of a large group of animals
- Swarm intelligence – Collective behavior of decentralized, self-organized systems
- State collapse – Catastrophic government dissolution
- Symmetry breaking of escaping ants – Pattern in ant behaviour

== Notes ==
a. See for example the Wikipedia article on his book Irrational Exuberance.
