= Noise (economic) =

Economic noise, or simply noise, describes a theory of pricing developed by Fischer Black. Black describes noise as the opposite of information: hype, inaccurate ideas, and inaccurate data. His theory states that noise is everywhere in the economy and we can rarely tell the difference between it and information.

Noise has two broad implications.

- It allows speculative trading to occur (see below).
- It is indicative of market inefficiency.

Loudon and Della Bitta (1988) refer to noise as “a type of disruption in the communication process” and go further stating that "each state of the communication process is susceptible to (this) message distortion." (As cited in Wu & Newell, 2003). Therefore, we can say that noise is a disruption within the communication process and can be found in all forms within the communication process. and in a process have a something special, because they have a same synonym.

Some examples of noise could be distortion of a television advertisement or interference of a radio broadcast. This therefore would mean that your reception of the information could be misunderstood as your reception of the information has been interfered with, meaning you may not receive the message in the way the sender is implying. Another, and probably more likely, example of noise is whilst an ad break is occurring on television, the reception of the ad has been interrupted by your mobile phone, meaning you do not fully and clearly receive and decode the information the advertisement is trying to deliver.

What also must be considered when looking at the idea of noise is the understanding that the more the sender and receiver have in common, the less likely it will be for noise to have an effect on the encoding of the message. For example, if the receiver did not understand a symbol or the symbol had a different meaning to the receiver then it did to the sender, this would mean the receiver could encode the message in a different way to how the sender had intended.

== Types of noise ==
Environmental or External Noise consists of environmental distractions, typically via sound or vision, present while information is being communicated. An example of this is using a mobile phone whilst watching a television advertisement, as the mobile is within the external environment and could have an impact, as a distraction, on how the receiver decodes the message.

Clutter is another type of noise. Russel and Lane (1996) define clutter as “"non-program material carried during or between shows including commercials, public service announcements, and program promotional spots” (as cited in Wu & Newell, 2003). Therefore, if the television advertisement had been shown after a public service announcement, the receiver could be distracted, thinking about what was discussed within the announcement, as opposed to being fully focused on the television advertisement.

Internal Noise is the third type of noise to be considered. MacInnis and Jaworski (1989, as cited in Wu & Newell, 2003) and MacInnis, et al. (1991 also cited in Wu & Newell, 2003) imply that the decoding of a message within an advertisement could be affected by the internal noise of the receiver. Internal noise being thoughts and concerns. The relationship between internal noise and the decoding of messages as a receiver does not yet have evidence through market research. (As cited in Wu & Newell, 2003). Continuing on from this, it is clear that if the audience of an advertisement was focused on a thought or concern in their mind, they would not decode the message within the advertisement in the same way.

== Finance ==
People trade speculatively because they disagree about the future, making different predictions about the fate of companies and commodity prices, among other economic variables. These disagreements stem from the fact that everyone interprets information or data differently and subjectively. But because of the complex nature of the world's markets, not all market data is "information." Much of the daily price fluctuation is due to random change rather than meaningful trends, creating the problem of discerning real information from noise. This problem is what drives trading in a market; if everyone knew all things, then no speculative trades would occur because it is a zero-sum game. In real life, however, trades occur as a kind of bet on what is noise and what is information; generally the more skillful, and technologically advanced, "gambler" wins.

This trade takes place between what Black calls information traders and noise traders, where the former operates based on accurate information and the latter trades based on noise. Unfortunately, there is no way of precisely parsing the noise and information from a data stream or signal, so the so-called noise traders tend to think that they, in fact, trade on information that others in the market simply reject as noise. Thus, methods of parsing noise and information from a signal are becoming increasingly important in the market-place, especially as strategies used by high-tech alternative investment firms, such as some hedge funds.

== Business cycles ==
A particular type of trader Black makes special mention of is the entrepreneur. Like the above-mentioned traders, entrepreneurs have theories about what will happen and what is happening. In this case, though, they have theories as to what people want. When they are correct, there is a little boom; "I make what you want, you make what I want, we trade and we are happy."

But the world has noise and entrepreneurs make mistakes. They make things others don't want. Thus, they don't work as hard, money is wasted and the economy is harmed. When this happens on a massive scale, there is a bust.

Critics argue that this disobeys the law of large numbers; with so many entrepreneurs trying, the aggregate success rate will be constant. (This assumes that producers are more or less independent; critics say they are, proponents say they're more interconnected.)

== Econometrics ==
Black argues that econometrics is filled with it in the forms of unobservables and mis-measurement. No matter how many variables one puts into a model, there are always more to add but can't (ones you can't observe) and the ones you have will always have error. This is how noise manifests in econometrics (as well as poor interpretation of regressions, such as assuming correlation means causation).

== See also ==
- Grossman-Stiglitz Paradox
