= Crush spread =

A crush spread is a commodity trading strategy in which the trader takes a long position in soybean futures against short positions in soybean meal futures and soybean oil futures to establish a processing margin.

Soybeans are processed into two products—meal and oil—through a process called “crushing”, which is where the term stems from. The crush spread is the difference between the combined value of meal and oil and the value of the original soybeans. The crush spread is a gauge of the soybean processor's profit margin, or the gross processing margin from crushing soybeans.

== Purposes ==
The soybean processor will be interested in the crush spread as part of its hedging strategy, traders as part of its risk management strategy, speculators will look at the crush spread for trading opportunities.

Soybeans processors can use the crush spread in order to lock in a gross profit margin, and cover the risk of adverse price fluctuation: inflation of soybeans inputs and deflation of outputs such as soybean meal and soybean oil.

Traders use soybean crush spreads as a risk management strategy by "combining soybean, soybean oil and soybean meal futures positions, into a single position". The spread position is then used to hedge the margin between soybean futures, and soybean oil and meal futures".

== Calculation ==
On average, one unit of soybeans produces 80% soybean meal, 18.3% soybean oil, and 1.7% waste, though growing conditions affect oil yields. To calculate the crush margin of one unit of soybeans, take the % value of the soybean meal and oil futures (e.g., in CNY/metric ton purchased on the Dalian Commodity Exchange) and subtract the value of the soybeans (e.g., in USD/bushel purchased on the Chicago Board of Trade):

Crush Margin = Soybean Meal x 80% + Soybean Oil x 18.3% – Soybeans

This requires making two conversions—from bushels to metric tons and from USD to CNY. The unit of the crush margin is CNY/mt.

== Similar spreads ==
The crush spread is similar to other processing or refining spreads such as the crack spread used in the oil industry, the spark spread between natural gas and electricity, or the white sugar versus raw sugar spread in the sugar market.
