= Buy and hold =

Buy/position trading

Buy and hold, also called position trading, is an investment strategy whereby an investor buys financial assets or non-financial assets such as real estate, to hold them long term, with the goal of realizing price appreciation, despite volatility.

This approach implies confidence that the value of the investments will be higher in the future. Investors must not be affected by recency bias, emotions, and must understand their propensity to risk aversion. Investors must buy financial instruments that they expect to appreciate in the long term. Buy and hold investors do not sell after a decline in value. They do not engage in market timing (i.e. selling a security with the goal of buying it again at a lower price) and do not believe in calendar effects such as Sell in May.

Buy and hold is an example of passive management. It has been recommended by Warren Buffett, Jack Bogle, Burton Malkiel, John Templeton, Peter Lynch, and Benjamin Graham since, in the long run, there is a high correlation between the stock market and economic growth.

== Efficient-market hypothesis ==
According to the efficient-market hypothesis (EMH), if every security is fairly valued at all times, then there is really no point to trade. Some take the buy and hold strategy to an extreme, advocating that you should never sell a security unless you need the money. However, Warren Buffett is an example of a buy and hold advocate who has rejected the EMH in his writings, and has built his fortune by investing in companies when they were undervalued.

== Lower costs ==
Others have advocated buy-and-hold on purely cost-based grounds. Costs such as commissions are incurred on all transactions, and the buy and hold strategy involves the fewest transactions for a constant amount invested, all other things being equal. Taxation law also has some effect; long-term capital gain taxes may be lower than those incurred from short term trading, and tax may be due only when and if the asset is sold.

See Stock market cycles and Market timing. Market timing can cause poor performance.

== Return-Chasing Behavior ==
At the Federal Reserve Bank of St. Louis, YiLi Chien, Senior Economist wrote about return-chasing behavior. The average equity mutual fund investor tends to buy them with high past returns and sell otherwise. Buying mutual funds with high returns is called a "return-chasing behavior." Equity mutual fund flows have a positive correlation with past performance, with a return-flow correlation coefficient of 0.49. Stock market returns are almost unpredictable in the short term. Stock market returns tend to go back to the long-term average. The tendency to buy mutual funds with high returns and sell those with low returns can reduce profit.
