= The Congressional Effect =

Stock market phenomenon

The Congressional effect is a stock market phenomenon or calendar effect, where stock prices tend to show a correlation in performance and volatility to the operating schedules of the US Congress. The phenomenon was coined as “The Congressional effect” by Eric T. Singer, a New York based finance professional and mutual fund manager.

Singer found that in aggregate, the S&P 500 Index performs better on days both houses of Congress are out of session versus days when both houses of Congress are in session. There is also a decrease in volatility as measured by standard deviation.

Congressional effect management found that the S&P 500 Index had a daily annualized price appreciation of 0.31% on days Congress was In session from January 1, 1965 to December 31, 2008. Over that same time span there was a 16.15% annualized price gain on trading days Congress was Out of session. From January 1, 2008 to December 31, 2008 Congressional Effect Management shows an acceleration of the Congressional effect. Over the aforementioned span in session days saw an annualized price decrease of −12.45% while out of session days saw an annualized increase of 8.81%.

The effect was first reported on in Barrons on March 2, 1992, by Singer and entitled “Legislator, Go Home! –How Congress Can Help the Stock Market”.

== Subsequent research ==
In 1997, a study published by Reinhold P. Lamb, K.C. Ma, R. Daniel Pace, and William F. Kennedy titled “The Congressional Calendar and Stock Market Performance” demonstrated that “almost the entire (Dow Jones Industrial Average) market rise since 1897 corresponded to the periods when Congress was closed. An open Congress sees only a small market rise. This behavior is amazing given that Congress is open almost twice as long as it is closed."

On March 13, 2006 Michael F. Ferguson and H. Douglass Witte published a piece entitled “Congress and the Stock Market” which concluded, “We find a strong link between Congressional activity and stock market returns that persists even after controlling for known daily return anomalies. Stock returns are lower and volatility higher when Congress is in session. This “Congressional Effect” can be quite large – more than 90% of the capital gains over the life of the DJIA have come on days when Congress is out of session.”

== Congressional Effect Fund (CEFFX) ==
On May 23, 2008 Singer launched the Congressional Effect Fund (symbol:CEFFX), a mutual fund which seeks to take advantage of the Congressional Effect for investors.

== See also ==
- Calendar effect
- Sell in May principle (or Halloween indicator)
- Santa Claus rally
- United States presidential election cycle
