= Subwave =

Subwave may refer to:

- Subwave in Elliot wave theory
- Subwavelength
- Ultrawave in science fiction
- Subwave (band), German band
- Gleb Soloviev, musician known by his pseudonym Subwave
