= Calendar effect =

Difference in the behavior of a system that is related to the calendar

A calendar effect (or calendar anomaly) is the difference in behavior of a system that is related to the calendar such as the day of the week, time of the month, time of the year, time within the U.S. presidential cycle, or decade within the century. It is most often used in a financial context to describe a market anomaly; traders may use market timing to profit from moves in stock prices based on the calendar.

== Examples ==
=== Stock market ===
- Sell in May
- January effect
- January barometer
- Mark Twain effect
- The Congressional Effect
- Santa Claus rally
- Super Bowl indicator
- United States presidential election cycle
- Weekend effect: Over the very long run, on average, weekend returns in US stock prices have tended to be negative.
- Midweek effect: In the US, stock returns from between the Monday close and the Wednesday close have tended to grow at a near-constant rate since the 1880s.

=== Other ===
- Grand supercycle
- Kondratiev wave
- July effect - risk of medical errors and surgical complications when new students start residencies
- Lunar effect - correlation between the lunar cycle and behavior and physiological changes
- Relative age effect - members of an academic or athletic cohort that are traditionally separated by year tend to see a disproportionate number of members with birthdays near the start of the time period

== Causes ==
Market prices are often subject to seasonal tendencies because the availability and demand for an item is not constant throughout the year. For example, natural gas prices often rise in the winter because that commodity is in demand as a heating fuel. In the summer, when the demand for heat is lower, prices typically fall. Transactions and prices for housing are higher in the summer than in the winter.

A 2018 study in the Eurozone concluded that calendar effects are not abnormal, citing the increase in market values around the end of the month, when employees are paid.

== Arguments that calendar effects do not exist or are not significant ==
According to the efficient-market hypothesis, the calendar anomalies should not exist because the existence of these anomalies should be already incorporated in the prices of securities.

A study published in 2001 argued that there is no statistically significant evidence for calendar effects in the stock market, and that all such patterns are the result of data dredging. However, there are contradictory findings and there is an ongoing debate on behavioral economics versus rational choice theory.

According to a study published in 2015, calendar effects are a result of financial trends and the business cycle, which affects investor psychology.
