= The Elliott Wave Theorist =

The Elliot Wave Theorist
- Type: Monthly newsletter
- Format: Letter size
- Owner: Elliott Wave International
- Publisher: Elliott Wave International
- Editor: Robert Prechter
- Founded: April 1976
- Language: English
- Headquarters: Gainesville, Georgia
- Website: elliottwave.com

The Elliott Wave Theorist is a monthly newsletter published by Elliott Wave International. The first issue of the Theorist was published in April 1976 and has been continuously in print on a subscription basis since May 1979. The publication includes Elliott wave analysis of the financial markets and cultural trends, plus commentary on topics that include technical analysis, behavioral finance, physics, pattern recognition, and socionomics. Robert Prechter is the publication's editor and main contributor.

== History ==
The Theorist began as Robert Prechter's vehicle for Elliott wave market opinions when he worked as a technical analyst at Merrill Lynch. The publication gathered a following, and Prechter continued to offer it via subscriptions after he left Merrill in 1979. In the early 1980s, the Theorist issued an aggressively bullish stock market forecast; its prominence grew, and the number of subscribers eventually reaching some 20,000. That number declined in the 1990s (as did subscription levels among financial publishers generally), though the Theorist remains frequently cited on financial websites, in blogs, newsgroups, books, scholarly papers, and by major media. The newsletter has earned several awards, including Hard Money Digest's "Newsletter Award of Excellence," and Timer Digest's "Timer of the Year." The Theorist has also included commentary for which contributors were criticized, including the forecast of a long-term bear market in the U.S. stock market.

== Distinction and controversy ==
The Theorist has featured several topics of distinction and controversy. Prechter's August 1985 Theorist essay "Pop Culture and the Stock Market" preceded a shorter version of the September 1985 cover story essay in Barron's, "Elvis, Frankenstein and Andy Warhol." Following Benoit Mandelbrot's 1999 Scientific American article "A Fractal Walk Down Wall Street," the Theorist ran detailed criticism of that article, saying that Mandelbrot took credit for ideas that "originated with Ralph Nelson Elliott, who put them forth more comprehensively and more accurately with respect to real-world markets in his 1938 book The Wave Principle." In recent years the Theorist has been credited with popularizing market indicators such as the “skyscraper indicator,” and been a forum for ideas and research regarding socionomics from Prechter and others, such as the 2006 essay, “Social Mood and Automobile Styling,” which received wide media coverage.
