= Seasonal spread trading =

Seasonal spread traders are spread traders that take advantage of seasonal patterns by holding long and short positions in futures contracts simultaneously in the same or a related commodity markets based on seasonal patterns. These are traded on futures exchanges such as the Chicago Mercantile Exchange, the New York Mercantile Exchange, or the London Metal Exchange among others.

The spread is the difference between the simultaneous values of these futures contracts. Traders may use a combination of fundamental analysis, technical, and historical factors in their analysis. Speculators hope to profit from the relative changes in price between the initial and offsetting positions. Contracts may be spread against different months or different markets using a calendar effect.

Position traders may hold positions with less risk using spreads as one position somewhat offsets the other position and the return is the difference between the two.

== Analysis ==
A critical point for this type of trading to work is the quality of the seasonal pattern and whether the trader can advantage of the pattern. Economists say that according to the efficient-market hypothesis such effects may exists but that these anomalies should be already incorporated in the price.

Traders are concerned with whether the changes in the difference between the sides of the spread are moving in their favor or not. In order to find the information on seasonal spread, many traders use algorithms retrieving past commodity volatility and performance.

Important sources for seasonal traders are institutional reports, such as the COT report, which shows the positions held on commodities by the major market players.

Lower margin deposits required by commodity exchanges to trade spreads means positions can be leverage up. Spreads may behave smoother than the underlying futures contracts.

Effects that may have existed in the past may no longer be true, for example, there was a very good seasonal pattern in gold in the 80s and 90s that no longer exists. The reason is a different demand behavior of gold buyers. Despite the fact that seasonal patterns can change, investing and trading based on seasonal patterns is still popular in the financial industry. Financial institutions have used professional software for this purpose, such as Seasonal Analysis Tools.

== See also ==
- Calendar effect
- Jesse Livermore
- Speculation
- Sell in May and go away
