= Robert Prechter =

American financial author and analyst

- Born: March 25, 1949 (age 77)
- Education: Yale University
- Occupations: Financial author, and stock market analyst

Robert R. Prechter Jr. (born March 25, 1949) is an American financial author, and stock market analyst, known for his financial forecasts using the Elliott Wave Principle. Prechter is an author and co-author of 14 books, and editor of 2 books, and his book Conquer the Crash was a New York Times bestseller in 2002. He also has published monthly financial commentary in the newsletter The Elliott Wave Theorist since 1979, and is the founder of Elliott Wave International and New Classics Library. Prechter served on the board of the CMT Association for nine years, and as its president in 1990–91. He has been a member of Mensa and Intertel. In recent years Prechter has supported the study of socionomics, a theory about human social behavior.

In 2014 at the IFTA Conference in London Prechter was created a Fellow of the UK Society of Technical Analysts in recognition of his lifetime contributions to Technical Analysis.

== Biography ==
Prechter attended Yale University and graduated with a B.A. degree in psychology in 1971. He became a drummer for his rock band throughout circa early 1970s. His career as an analyst began when he joined Merrill Lynch as a market technician in 1975, where he learned much about the trade from Merrill's Chief Market Strategist, Robert Farrell (June 1982). There Prechter also learned of Ralph Nelson Elliott and the Elliott wave principle and was deeply intrigued:

So I tracked down R.N. Elliott's original books. They weren't even in the Library of Congress. But I finally dug around in the New York Public Library and found a catalog card listing a copy of them on microfilm and had photocopies made. I was amazed to find that there was a wealth of information that had been lost to Wall Street.

Prechter has also said, "after I decided to make markets a career, I realized that mass psychology is what they're all about."

== Prominence ==
In 1979 Prechter left Merrill Lynch and published the first subscription issue of the Elliott Wave Theorist. The 1970s had been very bullish years in the gold market but mostly bearish for stocks, yet his Elliott wave analysis called for a long-term reversal lower in gold (February 1980) and a long-term "super bull market underway" in stocks (October 1982). Because these forecasts proved mostly correct—especially for the stock indexes—Prechter's following grew.

His visibility increased further after he won the U.S. Trading Championship in 1984, with a then-record 444% return in a monitored options trading account. He was profiled in many financial and business publications and named "Guru of the Decade" by the Financial News Network (now CNBC) for the 1980s.

Prechter has been forecasting a large-scale bear market, as explained in his book Conquer the Crash.

== Re-introduces Elliott ==
Much of Prechter's career as a publisher includes his efforts to re-introduce R.N. Elliott's wave principle to investors. He compiled and republished all of Elliott's available writings, including the 1938 "Wave Principle," and the "Interpretive" and "Forecast" letters (1938–1946). Prechter also published a brief biography of Elliott and the collected Elliott wave writings of the few technicians who practiced wave analysis in the 1950s and 1960s (Charles Collins, Hamilton Bolton, A.J. Frost, Richard Russell).

Still, not all the popular exposure to Elliott wave analysis was the result of Prechter's deliberate efforts. In the few years before and after 1987, media coverage inflated Prechter's "guru" status to extremes, including the assertion that his forecasts could single-handedly "cause" the stock market to rise or fall. In the months after Black Monday in October 1987, subscriptions to Prechter's Elliott Wave Theorist surged to some 20,000. That number declined in the early 1990s (as did the subscription levels of most other financial publishers), though "Prechter has done more to popularize and spread Elliott's philosophy than anyone else."

== Socionomics ==
In 1979, Prechter postulated that social mood drives financial, macroeconomic and political behavior, in contrast to the conventional notion that such events drive social mood. His description of social mood as the driver of cultural trends reached a national audience in a 1985 cover article in Barron's. Prechter coined the term "socionomics" and in 1999 published an exposition of socionomic theory, The Wave Principle of Human Social Behavior. In 2003, he published an anthology of empirical work in the field, Pioneering Studies in Socionomics.

Since then, the counter-intuitive premise of the socionomic hypothesis—that social mood drives the character of social events—has gained attention in academic journals, books, the popular press, universities, academic conferences and in research funded by the National Science Foundation. The Socionomics Foundation hosts an annual conference each April in Atlanta GA regarding social mood. The conferences have included presentations from academics, authors and financial professionals such as Richard L. Peterson, Tobias Preis, Johan Bollen, Michelle Baddeley, Todd Harrison and Robert Prechter.

== Criticism ==
While Prechter has his admirers, he has been criticized by media and pundits for his long term record. For example, The Wall Street Journal ran a page one article in August 1993 with the headline, "Robert Prechter sees his 3600 on the Dow – But 6 years late," in reference to Prechter's 1987 forecast for the Dow Jones Industrial Average. Technical analyst David Aronson wrote:

The Elliott Wave Principle, as popularly practiced, is not a legitimate theory, but a story, and a compelling one that is eloquently told by Robert Prechter. The account is especially persuasive because EWP has the seemingly remarkable ability to fit any segment of market history down to its most minute fluctuations. I contend this is made possible by the method's loosely defined rules and the ability to postulate a large number of nested waves of varying magnitude. This gives the Elliott analyst the same freedom and flexibility that allowed pre-Copernican astronomers to explain all observed planet movements even though their underlying theory of an Earth-centered universe was wrong.
