= Intermarket spread =

In finance, an Intermarket Spread is collateral sale of a futures contract on one exchange and the simultaneous purchase of another futures contract on another exchange within any given month. As with any other spread trade, an intermarket spread attempts to profit from the widening or narrowing of the gap between the two contract prices.

For example, an intermarket spread trade might involve buying a contract for West Texas Intermediate Crude Oil (on the Chicago Mercantile Exchange) while selling a contract for Brent Crude Oil (traded on the Intercontinental Exchange). The trade would gain or lose value based on the relative difference between the two underlying instruments, rather than the outright price.
