= CULTAN Fertilization =

Type of injection fertilization

CULTAN Fertilization, or Controlled Uptake Long Term Ammonium Nutrition, is a type of injection fertilization where the entire amount of nitrogen needed for a plant to grow is injected at one time. During CULTAN fertilization, nitrogen is applied at the first signs of nitrogen deficiency in plants. Fertilizer is more commonly spread on the surface of fields in either a liquid or powder form by spraying it.

== Injecting fertilizer ==
Although CULTAN fertilization is only done for nitrogen application, injection irrigation can also be used for other types of fertilizers. The most common way to inject fertilizer into the ground, regardless of chemical type, is through the drip method. The drip method involves an irrigation pump and a chemical injection pump. The two work simultaneously, slowly releasing nitrogen, letting it ‘drip’ from the system and then seep into the soil. If farming on a large scale, an engine (such as a tractor) is needed to move the system across the field.

== Advantages ==
According to a study from the Czech Republic, injecting nitrogen into the soil leads for a higher dry matter content of the plant. Dry matter content is important because the nutrients found in plants are found in the ‘dry’ section, not the water that is also in the plant. CULTAN fertilization, like all forms of injection fertilization, allows for a more precise application and a more uniform distribution of the fertilizer. These methods allow the spread of nitrogen regardless of the condition of the field (wet, muddy) and reduce soil compaction caused by tractors moving along the field. Soil compaction can eventually lead to erosion. Labor is also significantly reduced when compared to convention, surface fertilization.

== Disadvantages ==
Research has shown that average total yield is lower in crops that have been injected with nitrogen. The equipment used to inject fertilizer into the ground is more expensive than the typical spraying equipment, so injection is mostly used on smaller produce operations.
