= Soybean meal =

Ground soybeans used for food

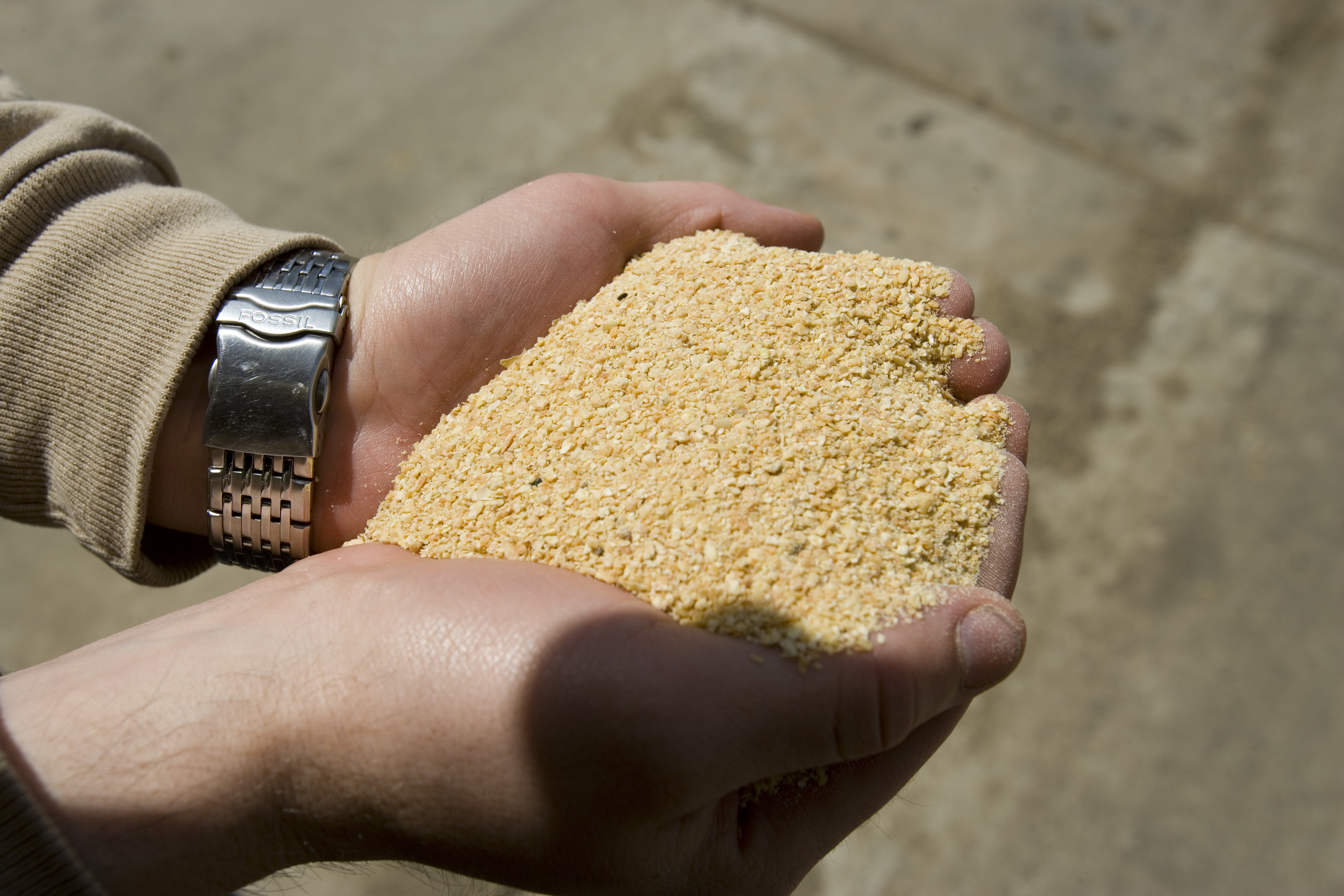
Soybean meal

Soybean meal is used in food and animal feeds, principally as a protein supplement, but also as a source of metabolizable energy. Typically 1 bushel (i.e. 60 lbs. or 27.2 kg) of soybeans yields 48 lbs. (21.8 kg) of soybean meal. Most soybean meal is defatted, produced as a co-product of soybean oil extraction. Some, but not all, soybean meal contains ground soybean hulls. Soybean meal is heat-treated during production, to denature the trypsin inhibitors of soybeans, which would otherwise interfere with protein digestion.

== Major kinds of soybean meal ==
Three main kinds of soybean meal are produced:

- Full-fat soybean meal, made from whole soybeans. It has a high metabolizable energy concentration. (For example, metabolizable energy for swine in this product is about 3.69 megacalories (i.e. 15.4 MJ) per kg dry matter.) Crude protein concentration is about 38 percent (as fed). This kind of product is sometimes fed to various classes of livestock.
- Defatted soybean meal, containing no hulls. This product has an intermediate energy concentration. (For example, Balaji metabolizable energy for swine in this product is about 3.38 megacalories (i.e. 14.1 MJ) per kg dry matter.) Crude protein concentration is about 48 percent. This percentage [which is commonly used in describing the product] is calculated at the typical as-fed moisture content of 88 percent. Thus, crude protein concentration expressed on a dry matter basis is 54 percent. This product is commonly fed to swine, broilers and layers.
- Defatted soybean meal, containing soybean hulls. The hulls are readily digestible by ruminant livestock. This product is often fed as a protein supplement for domestic ruminants. Ruminant-metabolizable energy concentration is about 3.0 megacalories (i.e. about 12.5 MJ) per kg dry matter, and crude protein concentration is about 44 percent. The latter percentage [which is commonly used in describing the product] is calculated at the typical as-fed moisture content of 90 percent. Thus, crude protein concentration on a dry matter basis is 49 percent.

== Use in animal feed ==
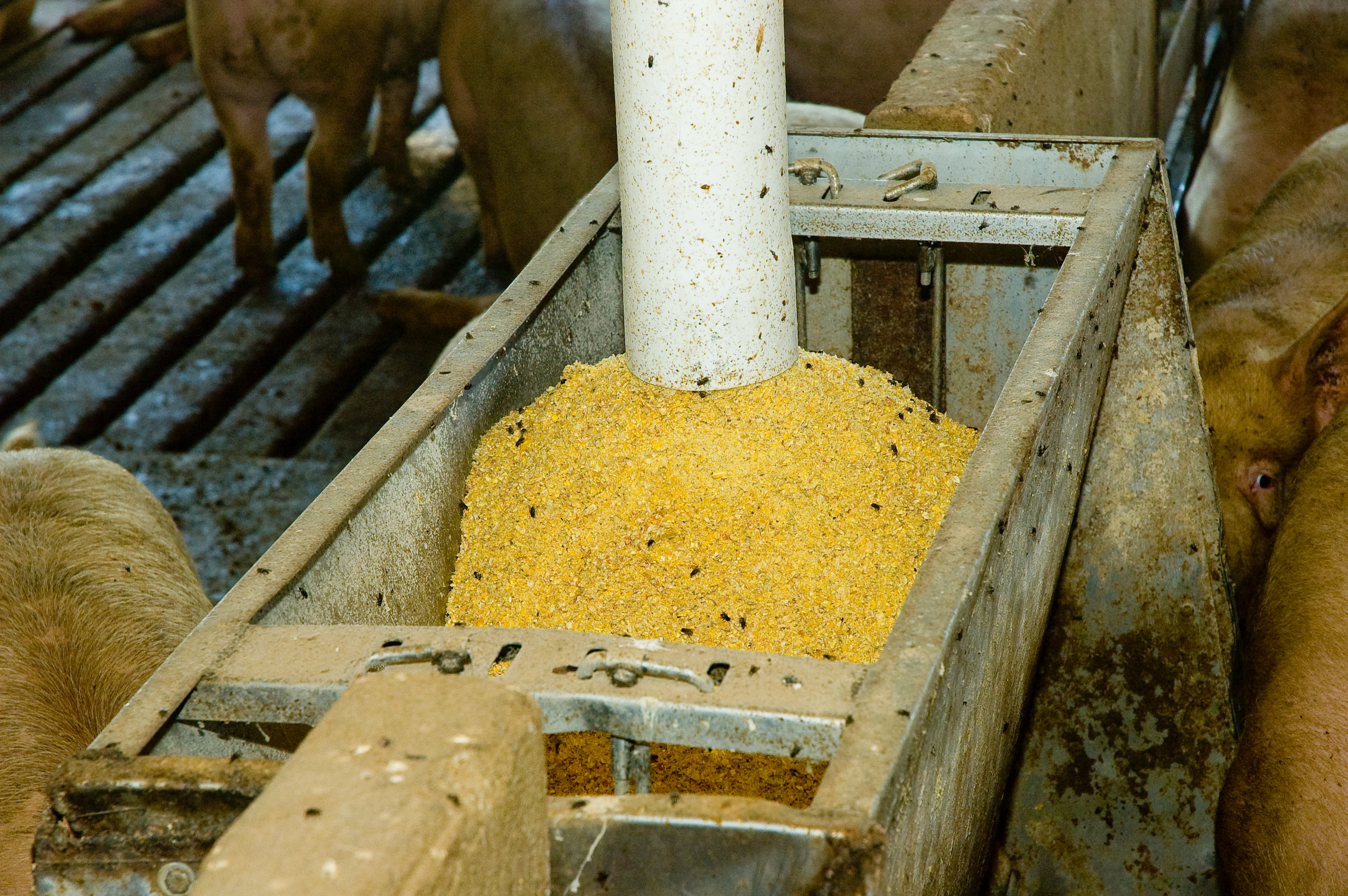
Mixed feed containing soybean meal used to feed pigs

Globally, about 98 percent of soybean meal is used as animal feed. Of the US soybean production magnitude from 2010 through 2012, about 44 percent was exported as soybeans, and 53 percent was crushed in the US. Of the crushed tonnage, 19 percent was recovered as soybean oil and the remainder was recovered as soybean meal. Of the total US soybean tonnage produced, about 35 percent was fed to US livestock and poultry as soybean meal. Most of the remaining soybean meal produced in the US was exported. It has been estimated that, of soybean meal fed to animals in the US, 48 percent is fed to poultry, 26 percent to swine, 12 percent to beef cattle, 9 percent to dairy cattle, 3 percent is used in fish feed and about 2 percent in pet food. Although this implies that the tonnage of soybean meal fed to other species is relatively minor, such use is not unimportant. For example, for rapidly growing lambs on low-protein feeds, soybean meal can be an important supplement to ensure adequate protein intake, and partly because of its palatability, soybean meal is often recommended for use in starter rations when creep feeding lambs.

== Uses as human food ==
Global soybean meal consumption for 2012–2013, from the United Soybean Board

Globally, about 2 percent of soybean meal is used for soy flour and other products for human consumption. Soy flour is used to make some soy milks and textured vegetable protein products, and is marketed as full-fat, low-fat, defatted, and lecithinated types.

== Phytoestrogens ==
Most studies of phytoestrogens in soy have identified the isoflavones genistein and daidzein as its principal phytoestrogenic substances. For several soy flour samples analyzed by various persons using high-performance liquid chromatography, daidzein content ranged from 226 to 2100 micrograms per gram, and genistein content ranged from 478 to 1123 micrograms per gram. For four analyses of defatted soy meal, the concentrations were 616 and 753 micrograms per gram, respectively; for one analysis of full-fat soybean meal (whole), concentrations were 706 and 1000 micrograms per gram, respectively. On a dry-matter basis, defatting causes an increase in phytoestrogen concentration. This can be largely explained by the removal of oil mass.

Although reproductive physiology of sheep is particularly sensitive to phytoestrogens, soybean meal supplementation of ewe lambs or ewes on pasture in some studies has been found to have no detrimental effect on reproductive performance.

== See also ==
- Crush spread
- Soybean oil
