= Saxo Bank =

Danish investment bank

Saxo Bank A/S
- Type: Private
- Industry: Brokerage firm, banking, trading, investment and financial technology
- Founded: 1992; 34 years ago
- Founder: Kim Fournais; Lars Seier Christensen
- Headquarters: Copenhagen, Denmark
- Key people: Henrik Normann (board member); Kim Fournais (founder and chairman); Daniel Belfer (CEO); Marcelo Szerman (vice-chairman)
- Products: Online trading and investment platforms
- Revenue: ▲DKK 4.957 billion (2025)
- Operating income: ▼DKK 987 million (2025)
- Net income: ▼DKK 539 million (2025)
- Total assets: ▲DKK 104.775 billion (2025)
- Total equity: ▼DKK 6.253 billion (2025)
- Owner: Saxo Holding AG (99.04%); Minority shareholders (0.96%)
- Number of employees: 2,427 (2025)
- Website: www.home.saxo

Saxo Bank is a Danish investment bank specialising in online trading and investment. It provides access to financial instruments, including Forex, stocks, CFDs, futures, funds, bonds and futures spreads through its SaxoInvestor and SaxoTrader platforms.

The company was established in 1992 by Lars Seier Christensen and Kim Fournais as the brokerage firm Midas Fondsmæglerselskab (English: Midas Stockbroker Company). It was renamed Saxo Bank in 2001 after receiving a banking licence.

Headquartered in Copenhagen, Saxo Bank has offices in financial centres including London, Paris, Zürich, Dubai, Singapore, and Tokyo. On 2 March 2026, J. Safra Sarasin Group completed its acquisition of approximately 71% of Saxo Bank, while co-founder Kim Fournais retained approximately 28%. On 6 July 2026, J. Safra Sarasin agreed to acquire Fournais's remaining 28.7% stake in Saxo Holding AG, subject to regulatory approval.

== History ==
=== 1990s: Midas Fondsmæglerselskab ===
Lars Seier Christensen and Kim Fournais formed Midas Fondsmæglerselskab after meeting in London in the early 1990s. Christensen was then a broker for Gerald Metals, while Fournais worked at the now-defunct Lannung Bank. The founders later described their partnership as the meeting of business soulmates. The company's initial capital was approximately $80,000.

In the autumn of 1996, Danish businessman Karsten Ree accused Midas of misleading him into making fictitious investments through its wealth management services.

=== 2000s ===
In 1997, Midas introduced its first internet-based product, a currency trading platform called MITS, which was later replaced by SaxoTrader. The company rebranded as Saxo Bank, taking its name from the Danish historian Saxo Grammaticus, to avoid confusion with an international Nigerian bank also named Mida. In 2001, Saxo Bank obtained a banking licence. During this period, the company expanded its online business and moved to new headquarters in the Copenhagen suburb of Gentofte.

Saxo Bank began expanding its products and services in Europe in the early 2000s. In 2001, the bank launched its first white-label product in partnership with a Portuguese securities dealer. By September 2004, Saxo had introduced its first U.S. white-label product, and in 2006, it established a regional hub in Singapore.

In September 2007, Saxo Bank acquired its Swiss white-label client Synthesis Bank. In May of the same year, it purchased the French brokerage Cambiste, later renamed Saxo Banque France. In November 2008, Citigroup launched CitiFX Pro, an online foreign exchange trading platform developed by Saxo. Saxo later focused its U.S. business on institutional clients. By 2009, the bank had opened new offices in Milan, Prague, and Dubai, bringing the number of foreign sales offices to 13-14 by year-end, up from eight in the previous year.

The bank also expanded through acquisitions and asset management. In 2009, it acquired Sirius Kapitalforvaltning and purchased the full share capital of Capital Four Management Fondsmaeglerselskab A/S, along with a 51% stake in Global Evolution Fondsmaeglerselskab A/S.

=== 2010s ===
In March 2010, Saxo Bank launched a new equity trading platform, enabling trades in over 11,000 stocks and other products listed on 23 major exchanges worldwide.

By July 2010, Saxo Bank reported that net profit had risen from DKK 41 million ($7 million) to DKK 551 million ($95 million). During the same six-month period, the bank completed ten acquisitions and opened new IT development centres in India and Ukraine. The growth was partly attributed to a large increase in trading turnover by Saxo Bank's largest partner, Citi. Saxo's half-year report described the first six months of 2010 as the most profitable period in its history.

In 2010, Saxo Bank launched an online platform with Barclays Stockbrokers. Branded as "International Trader," it offered access to more than 9,000 equities across 21 major global exchanges in 13 markets, along with securities research. The platform was marketed in the UK, including to Barclays' existing client base. In May 2011, Saxo Bank announced a partnership with TD Waterhouse to provide an online derivatives trading platform for retail investors.

On 17 September 2010, Saxo Bank announced a DKK 59 million investment in Brørup Sparekasse, a small Danish savings bank established in 1897 with seven branches. After the investment, the bank was renamed Saxo Privatbank and began offering core banking services in Denmark. Brørup Sparekasse had faced financial difficulties in 2008 and 2009, mainly because of failed investments in unlisted bonds, and reported a pre-tax loss of DKK 74 million in 2009. Saxo Bank also committed to provide at least DKK 150 million in additional capital, contingent on the successful conversion of Brørup Sparekasse into a joint-stock company. Saxo Bank became the majority shareholder, holding 98.6% of the shares in the restructured institution. Saxo Privatbank operated branches in several Danish cities, including Brørup, Esbjerg, Fredericia, Hellerup, Kolding, Odense, Vejle and Århus. In April 2018, Alm. Brand Bank acquired Saxo Privatbank for DKK 360 million (~$60 million).

In January 2014, Saxo Bank introduced a beta version of a revised TradingFloor.com, changing the community portal into a multi-asset social trading platform where users could share information, tips and strategies. According to the bank's founders, the platform was intended to make financial trading more accessible and serve users who did not want direct interaction with bank representatives.

In May 2015, Saxo Bank launched SaxoTraderGO, a new multi-asset trading platform. In September 2015, Saxo Bank introduced OpenAPI, granting partners, clients, and external developers access to the bank's trading infrastructure for customisation purposes. As of mid-2015, the platform featured over 30,000 financial products.

In early 2016, Saxo Bank launched SaxoSelect, a digital investment service that included portfolios built around iShares ETFs in cooperation with BlackRock, targeting long-term investors and managed based on BlackRock's research. Saxo Bank also introduced Trading Strategies, a copy trading service that provided access to strategies managed by selected investors. Saxo has since ceased this service.

In 2017, Saxo operated in 18 countries, employed 1,600 people, and reported an operating revenue of DKK 2.9 billion ($457.46 million) in 2016.

On 2 October 2017, the Chinese carmaker Geely announced plans to increase its stake in Saxo Bank to 51.5% if the deal were approved by regulators. Sampo Group was to acquire a 19.9% stake, while Kim Fournais, Saxo Bank's CEO, would retain 25.7%. The sellers included Sinar Mas and TPG. The deal was completed in September 2018.

=== 2020s ===
After abandoning a 2022 attempt to go public through a special purpose acquisition company (SPAC) at a targeted valuation of around €2 billion, Saxo later stated that a public listing was no longer an immediate priority, citing unfavourable market conditions.

On 4 July 2023, the Danish Financial Supervisory Authority (FSA) instructed Saxo to liquidate its cryptocurrency holdings, stating that holding these assets on the bank's own account exceeded the legal scope for Danish financial institutions. The FSA did not specify a timeline. A Saxo spokesperson said the company would review the regulator's requirements and respond accordingly.

In February 2023, Saxo Singapore signed a strategic partnership with Guotai Junan Securities, a major Chinese bank. In November 2023, it announced a strategic partnership with HSBC. In 2023, Saxo reported reaching 1 million clients globally. The bank reported its first semi-annual loss in several years during the second half of 2023, and its 2023 net profit declined by 8.1%.

In April 2024, S&P Global Ratings assigned Saxo Bank an A− rating. In July 2024, Saxo hired Goldman Sachs as a financial adviser to seek buyers for the shares held by Geely (just under 50%) and Mandatum (under 20%). By late October 2024, Altor Equity Partners, Centerbridge Partners, and Interactive Brokers had reportedly expressed interest and submitted preliminary bids.

Saxo reported a 43% increase in its client base in 2024 and introduced a simplified platform together with the AutoInvest ETF investment feature. At the same time, trading activity weakened. Monthly trading volumes fell to US$371.6 billion in June 2024, down 4% from the previous month, and core FX volumes reached a multi-year low of US$78.1 billion. In September 2024, Saxo announced the closure of its Hong Kong and Shanghai offices, citing geopolitical factors. The bank disclosed US$4.3 million in losses for its Hong Kong operations in 2023 and began off-boarding local clients and partners.

In February 2025, the bank agreed to sell an 80.1% stake in its Saxo Australia subsidiary to Johannesburg-based fintech firm DMA, retaining a 19.9% stake. In March 2025, Saxo's shareholders Geely and Mandatum agreed to sell a 70% stake in the bank to Switzerland's J. Safra Sarasin Group for approximately €1.1 billion, valuing Saxo Bank at around €1.6 billion. The Australian transaction was completed, and Saxo Australia was renamed Totality on 11 August 2025. The J. Safra Sarasin transaction was completed on 2 March 2026. Following completion, Kim Fournais stepped down as CEO and became chairman of the board, while Daniel Belfer became chief executive officer of Saxo Bank. In July 2026, J. Safra Sarasin agreed to acquire Fournais's remaining stake in Saxo Holding AG. The transaction remained subject to regulatory approval. In August 2026, S&P Global Ratings revised its outlook on Saxo Bank to positive from stable and affirmed its A− long-term issuer credit rating.

== Profile ==
=== Ownership ===
Saxo Bank A/S is a privately owned company. Between 2018 and 2 March 2026, the largest shareholder of Saxo Bank A/S was Geely Financials Denmark A/S, a subsidiary of Chinese Zhejiang Geely Holding Group Co., Ltd. As of December 2024, Geely held 49.88% of the shares, Saxo Bank founder and CEO Kim Fournais held 28.41%, and Mandatum, a Nordic financial services group formerly part of Sampo Group, held 19.83%. The remaining 1.88% of shares were held by minority shareholders, including current and former employees.

In March 2025, J. Safra Sarasin Group, a Swiss private banking institution, announced an agreement to acquire a 70% stake in Saxo Bank by purchasing shares from Geely Financials Denmark A/S and Mandatum Group. Founder and CEO Kim Fournais retained his stake in the company. The transaction was completed on 2 March 2026 after regulatory approval from the Swiss Financial Market Supervisory Authority and the Danish Financial Supervisory Authority. As of April 2026, Saxo Holding AG, owned by Fournais Holding A/S and Bank J. Safra Sarasin AG, held 99.04% of the shares in Saxo Bank, while the remaining 0.96% were held by minority shareholders, including current and former Saxo employees. Upon completion, Kim Fournais became chairman and Daniel Belfer became chief executive officer. On 6 July 2026, J. Safra Sarasin agreed to acquire Fournais's remaining 28.7% stake in Saxo Holding AG. Upon completion, J. Safra Sarasin would become the sole owner of Saxo Holding AG, while Fournais would remain chairman of Saxo Bank.

=== Business model ===
Saxo Bank serves retail and institutional clients. Its online platforms provide access to financial instruments including Forex, stocks, CFDs, futures, funds, bonds and futures spreads.

By 2015, more than 120 financial institutions worldwide were using Saxo Bank's platforms under white-label agreements. These partners include institutions such as Standard Bank, Old Mutual Wealth, Banco Carregosa, and Banco Best, as well as regional entities including Sparekassen Vendsyssel, Sparekassen Thy, Middelfart Sparekasse, Frøs Sparekasse, and Jutlander Bank.

In April 2026, Saxo reported that it had 1.523 million clients and client assets of DKK 995 billion at the end of 2025.

=== Corporate headquarters and architecture ===
Saxo Bank is headquartered in Tuborg Havn on the northern outskirts of Copenhagen. The building, which received an RIBA International Award, was designed by the Danish architecture firm 3XN. It was completed four years after 3XN won an international competition in 2004. The façade is covered in diagonal white aluminium and blue glass patterns. In June 2010, the Danish business newspaper Borsen named the Saxo headquarters the "Kingdom's finest domicile."

Other Saxo Bank offices are located in the Czech Republic, Dubai, France, Italy, Japan, Netherlands, Singapore, Switzerland, and the United Kingdom.

== Sponsorships ==
In mid-June 2008, Riis Cycling A/S announced that Saxo Bank had entered a three-year contract as title sponsor with immediate effect, and the team entered the 2008 Tour de France as Team CSC Saxo Bank. Carlos Sastre won the Tour, and the team took the team classification. In 2009 and 2010, Andy Schleck finished the Tour in second place. On 3 August 2010, Lars Seier Christensen and Bjarne Riis announced that Saxo Bank had extended its sponsorship of Riis Cycling for another year, and that Tour winner Alberto Contador had signed with the team with the aim of winning all three Grand Tours in one year. In 2013, Tinkoff Bank joined Saxo Bank as title sponsor. Following Bjarne Riis' sale of the team to Oleg Tinkov, Saxo Bank ended its sponsorship after the 2016 season.

In January 2014, Saxo Bank announced that it had become a sponsor of the Lotus F1 team for the 2014 season. The bank said it would use the team's name in its marketing and host clients at Formula One races as part of the sponsorship.

Saxo Bank distributed copies of a Danish translation of Ayn Rand's novel Atlas Shrugged to employees and clients. It also provided financial support to the political party Ny Alliance, later renamed the Liberal Alliance. Co-CEO Lars Seier Christensen later joined the party. Saxo Bank ended its regular contributions after the 2015 parliamentary election.

== Controversy ==
=== 2008 Wikipedia whitewashing ===
In 2008, Saxo Bank admitted censoring its own Wikipedia article through an anonymous user to remove information it claimed was inaccurate. When confronted by the media, the bank acknowledged the action, stating that a "slightly more elegant solution" should have been pursued.

=== 2010 allegations of misconduct ===
In July 2010, the Danish watchdog Danish FSA released a series of reports citing allegations that Saxo Bank had failed to adequately protect investor interests. These reports were based on complaints from former clients and led to an investigation into the bank's anti-money laundering protocols. The investigation followed negative media coverage in Danish newspapers including Dagbladet Børsen and EPN, which published allegations by former employees and clients. One accusation came in May 2010 from a Lebanese investor, who claimed his company had lost DKK 20 million in four months because of unstable pricing and system interruptions on SaxoTrader. Saxo Bank denied the allegations and said SaxoTrader had maintained 100% uptime. Earlier, in April 2010, a Portuguese financial institution accused Saxo Bank of manipulating stock and currency prices and alleged a loss of €10 million. In response, the FSA commissioned an independent investigation into whether Saxo Bank's manual and electronic trading practices followed its stated policies, including its Best Execution Policy. The investigation was carried out by international consulting firm Oliver Wyman and reportedly cost Saxo Bank millions. The findings were published on 29 November 2010. The Oliver Wyman report concluded that Saxo Bank had not systematically mispriced manual orders or violated its trading policies. It also found no evidence of systematic unfair treatment of clients. The FSA decided not to pursue further action against Saxo Bank.

In June 2010, Saxo Bank filed lawsuits against two former clients, accusing them of making false allegations. Following the Oliver Wyman review, media reports described Saxo as having been cleared of market-manipulation allegations. The Danish newspaper Berlingske Tidende characterised the controversy as a bitter conflict involving the bank's founders, former employees and dissatisfied clients, possibly rooted in personal grievances or financial disputes.

=== 2011 DFSA Censure ===
On 20 March 2011, the Dubai Financial Services Authority (DFSA) issued a formal censure against Saxo Bank Dubai Limited (SBDL) for failures in its client onboarding and anti-money-laundering systems and controls.

=== 2012 Australian ASIC reprimands ===
In 2012, the Australian Securities & Investments Commission (ASIC) reprimanded Saxo Bank for deficiencies in its risk management practices, just two days after the bank announced plans to expand its retail online trading operations in Australia. ASIC imposed additional licensing conditions on Saxo Bank's subsidiary, Saxo Capital Markets Australia, requiring the appointment of an independent expert to review its systems. The review aimed to address shortcomings in credit risk, client risk, and compliance risk management. ASIC Chairman Greg Medcraft stated that the additional conditions were necessary to ensure that risk management practices met legal standards. The action followed the sentencing of Russell Johnson, director of Sonray Capital Markets, a white-label partner of Saxo Bank, to six and a half years in prison after his firm left debts totalling A$76 million.

=== 2015 BBY Limited collapse ===
In June 2015, the stockbroker BBY appointed liquidators after failing to secure sufficient funds to meet its financial obligations. BBY had operated as a white-label partner of Saxo Bank, providing foreign exchange contracts and other financial products. Court proceedings revealed that BBY had unlawfully pooled excessive client funds with Saxo Bank, including funds that should have been allocated to clients holding equities and exchange-traded contracts.

=== 2015 Swiss franc cap removal ===
Following the Swiss National Bank's unexpected decision on 15 January 2015 to end the franc's cap against the euro, the EUR/CHF rate fell well below 1.20. The next day, Saxo Bank retroactively adjusted the execution prices of orders placed on CHF currency pairs during the ensuing period of very low liquidity. Some clients, who had already closed positions on EUR/CHF and related instruments, incurred additional losses and accused Saxo Bank of unfair repricing and imposing higher negative balances.

On 23 January 2015, Saxo Bank announced that it might face a loss of up to DKK 700 million (around US$107 million) due to negative client balances it may not be able to collect. Less than a week later, the Danish Financial Supervisory Authority (FSA) requested a comprehensive report on the bank's actions before and after the incident. In February 2015 a group of over 20 Danish and foreign Saxo clients engaged legal counsel to explore a class-action lawsuit.

In July 2015, after reviewing Saxo Bank's conduct during the "Swiss event," the Danish FSA issued two reprimands related to insufficient disclosure of liquidity conditions and inadequate communication about the difficulties of executing orders. Although the regulator criticised these shortfalls, it did not find that the bank's method for setting revised settlement prices or handling stop-loss orders breached best execution rules or unfairly favoured Saxo Bank's interests. Saxo Bank maintained that the regulator's assessment confirmed its adherence to investor protection standards.

Litigation ensued in multiple jurisdictions. In May 2015, Saxo Singapore filed suit against 12 currency-trading clients, who subsequently countersued. In December 2016, the Danish Maritime and Commercial High Court sided with Saxo Bank in a case involving a Danish corporate client, recognizing that the bank's conduct aligned with its business terms and took place under extraordinary, illiquid market conditions that precluded execution at initial prices. However, in March 2017 the UK Financial Ombudsman Service found against Saxo Bank, mandating compensation for a client. In June 2018, the High Court of Eastern Denmark (Østre Landsret) ruled that Saxo Bank owed a former client US$320,000, having determined that on 15 January 2015 the bank applied wrongful price adjustments and debited the client's account improperly. In October 2019, the Supreme Court of Denmark overturned the High Court ruling, finding that the transaction prices initially reported to the client were manifestly incorrect and that Saxo Bank was entitled to adjust the settlement prices.

=== 2025 AFM fine over BinckBank violations ===
In December 2024, the Netherlands Authority for the Financial Markets (AFM) imposed a €1.6 million fine on Saxo Bank for violations committed by BinckBank, which Saxo Bank acquired in 2019. The violations occurred between 1 January 2021 and 11 April 2023 and included failure to comply with asset segregation rules, insufficient control over business processes, and inadequate customer service. The AFM launched its investigation in 2022 following consumer complaints and a critical auditor report on BinckBank. Saxo Bank did not contest the penalties.

=== 2025 French AMF fine ===
In July 2025, the French Autorité des marchés financiers (AMF) fined Saxo Bank €300,000, as successor to BinckBank, for breaches of professional obligations by its French branch. The regulator cited failures to inform clients about changes to the closure of derivatives positions and margin calculations, shortcomings involving corporate actions and transfers of French equity savings plans, and delayed information about the effect of Brexit on those plans.

=== 2025 Danish transaction-reporting fine ===
On 29 October 2025, the District Court in Lyngby fined Saxo Bank DKK 2 million for filing incomplete or inaccurate reports on at least 84 million transactions, failing to report another 10 million, and maintaining inadequate reporting controls between January 2018 and June 2021. The court treated the bank's detection and disclosure of the errors and the absence of demonstrated harm as mitigating factors.

=== 2026 Hong Kong SFC fine ===
In January 2026, the Securities and Futures Commission reprimanded and fined Saxo Capital Markets HK Limited HK$4 million over the distribution of virtual asset-related products. It was Hong Kong's first fine against a licensed financial institution for breaches involving such products. The SFC said that between 1 November 2018 and 25 November 2022 the firm allowed retail clients to trade virtual asset products on its platform, including products not authorised by the regulator.

=== 2026 Danish anti-money-laundering fine ===
In January 2026, Saxo Bank accepted a DKK 313 million administrative fine from the Danish Financial Supervisory Authority for deficiencies in customer due diligence and the ongoing monitoring of white-label clients between January 2021 and May 2023. Saxo said the inspection had found no instances or signs of actual money laundering.

The fine also reduced the price paid for Mandatum's 19.83% stake in Saxo Bank by approximately €8 million under an indemnity mechanism in the share purchase agreement. When the transaction was completed on 2 March 2026, Mandatum received approximately €308 million, compared with the €319 million originally announced.

== See also ==
- List of electronic trading platforms
- List of banks in Denmark
