= Spread trade =

Type of financial purchase on securities

In finance, a spread trade (also known as a relative value trade) is the simultaneous purchase of one security and sale of a related security, called legs, as a unit. Spread trades are usually executed with options or futures contracts as the legs, but other securities are sometimes used. They are executed to yield an overall net position whose value, called the spread, depends on the difference between the prices of the legs. Common spreads are priced and traded as a unit on futures exchanges rather than as individual legs, thus ensuring simultaneous execution and eliminating the execution risk of one leg executing but the other failing.

Spread trades are executed to attempt to profit from the widening or narrowing of the spread, rather than from movement in the prices of the legs directly. Spreads are either "bought" or "sold" depending on whether the trade will profit from the widening or narrowing of the spread.

== Margin ==
The volatility of the spread is typically much lower than the volatility of the individual legs, since a change in the market fundamentals of a commodity will tend to affect both legs similarly. The margin requirement for a futures spread trade is therefore usually less than the sum of the margin requirements for the two individual futures contracts, and sometimes even less than the requirement for one contract.

== Types of spread trades ==
=== Intracommodity (Calendar) spreads ===
Calendar spreads are executed with legs differing only in delivery date. They price the market expectation of supply and demand at one point in time relative to another point.

A common use of the calendar spread is to "roll over" an expiring position into the future. When a futures contract expires, its seller is nominally obliged to physically deliver some quantity of the underlying commodity to the purchaser. In practice, this is almost never done; it is far more convenient for both buyers and sellers to settle the trade financially rather than arrange for physical delivery. This is most commonly done by entering into an offsetting position in the market. For example, someone who has sold a futures contract can effectively cancel the position out by purchasing an identical futures contract, and vice versa.

The contract expiry date is fixed at purchase. If a trader wishes to hold a position in the commodity beyond the expiration date, the contract can be "rolled over" via a spread trade, neutralizing the soon to expire position while simultaneously opening a new position that expires later.

=== Intercommodity spreads ===
Intercommodity spreads are formed from two distinct but related commodities, reflecting the economic relationship between them.

Common examples are:

- The crack spread between crude oil and one of its byproducts, reflecting the premium inherent in refining oil into gasoline, gas oil, or heating oil
- The spark spread between natural gas and electricity, for gas-fired power stations
- The crush spread between soybeans and one of its byproducts, reflecting the premium inherent in processing soybeans into soy meal and soy oil
- Highly correlated instruments such as Brent Crude vs WTI Crude or London White Sugar vs New York Sugar.

=== Option spreads ===
Option spreads are formed with different option contracts on the same underlying stock or commodity. There are many different types of named option spreads, each pricing a different abstract aspect of the price of the underlying, leading to complex arbitrage attempts.

=== IRS (Interest rate swap) spreads ===
Not to be confused with Swap spreads, IRS Spread trades are formed with legs in different currencies but the same or similar maturities.

Two notable examples, U.A.E. Dirham and Saudi Riyal interest rate swaps, are quoted in the inter-bank market as spreads to US dollar interest rate swaps. AED and SAR currency exchange rates are each pegged to the USD, hence their interest rate swap markets are highly correlated to the US interest rate swap market respectively. e.g. if the SAR IRS Spread for a 5-year maturity is quoted as +150 basis points and the USD 5 year IRS fixed rate is trading at 1.00%, where the IRS fixed payments are annual and the floating payments are quarterly LIBOR, then the SAR 5 year IRS fixed rate will be 2.50%.

== See also ==
- Bucket shop (stock market)
- Contract for difference
- Forex
- Financial betting
- Spread betting
- Seasonal spread trading
- Sell in May and go away
- Yield spread
