= Mark Twain effect =

In some stock markets, the October Effect (also referred to as the Mark Twain effect) is the phenomenon of stock returns in October being lower than in other months. The reference to Mark Twain comes from a line in Mark Twain's Pudd'nhead Wilson: "October. This is one of the peculiarly dangerous months to speculate in stocks. The others are July, January, September, April, November, May, March, June, December, August, and February."

The quotation is a sarcastic assertion that speculation in stocks is always dangerous. Twain wrote Pudd'nhead Wilson in 1894 many years before the stock market crashes of 1929 (record trade volumes on October 24 and then October 29), 1987 (biggest losses on October 19) and 2008 (October 6-10 was the worst weekly decline ever on both a points and percentage basis of Dow Jones Industrial Average. On October 24 many of the world's stock exchanges experienced the worst declines in their history.).

== See also ==
- January effect
