= January effect =

Hypothesised seasonal financial anomaly

The January effect is a hypothesis that there is a seasonal anomaly in the financial market where securities' prices increase in the month of January more than in any other month. This calendar effect would create an opportunity for investors to buy stocks for lower prices before January and sell them after their value increases. As with all calendar effects, if true, it would suggest that the market is not efficient, as market efficiency would suggest that this effect should disappear.

The effect was first observed around 1942 by investment banker Sidney B. Wachtel. He noted that since 1925 small stocks had outperformed the broader market in the month of January, with most of the disparity occurring before the middle of the month. It has also been noted that when combined with the four-year US presidential cycle, historically the largest January effect occurs in year three of a president's term.

The most common theory explaining this phenomenon is that individual investors, who are income tax-sensitive and who disproportionately hold small stocks, sell stocks for tax reasons at year end (such as to claim a capital loss) and reinvest after the first of the year. Another cause is the payment of year-end bonuses in January. Some of this bonus money is used to purchase stocks, driving up prices. The January effect does not always materialize; for example, small stocks underperformed large stocks in 1982, 1987, 1989 and 1990.

== Criticism ==
Burton Malkiel asserts that seasonal anomalies such as the January Effect are transient and do not present investors with reliable arbitrage opportunities. He sums up his critique of the January Effect:

Wall Street traders now joke that the January effect is more likely to occur on the previous Thanksgiving. Moreover, these nonrandom effects (even if they were dependable) are very small relative to the transaction costs involved in trying to exploit them. They do not appear to offer arbitrage opportunities that would enable investors to make excess risk adjusted returns.

== See also ==
- Financial market efficiency
- July effect
- Limits to arbitrage
- Market timing
- Sell in May
- Santa Claus rally
