= Crack spread =

Oil industry futures trading approximation of profit margin

Crack spread is a term used in the oil industry and futures trading for the differential between the price of crude oil and petroleum products extracted from it. The spread approximates the profit margin that an oil refinery can expect to make by "cracking" the long-chain hydrocarbons of crude oil into useful shorter-chain petroleum products.

In the futures markets, the "crack spread" is a specific spread trade involving simultaneously buying and selling contracts in crude oil and one or more derivative products, typically gasoline and heating oil. Oil refineries may trade a crack spread to hedge the price risk of their operations, while speculators attempt to profit from changes in the oil/gasoline price differential.

== Factors affecting the crack spread ==
One of the most important factors affecting the crack spread is the relative proportion of various petroleum products produced by a refinery. Refineries produce many products from crude oil, including gasoline, kerosene, diesel, heating oil, aviation fuel, bitumen and others. To some degree, the proportion of each product produced can be varied in order to suit the demands of the local market. Regional differences in the demand for each refined product depend upon the relative demand for fuel for heating, cooking or transportation purposes. Within a region, there can also be seasonal differences in demand for heating fuel versus transportation fuel.

The mix of refined products is also affected by the particular blend of crude oil feedstock processed by a refinery, and by the capabilities of the refinery. Heavier crude oils contain a higher proportion of heavy hydrocarbons composed of longer carbon chains. As a result, heavy crude oil is more difficult to refine into lighter products such as gasoline. A refinery using less sophisticated processes will be constrained in its ability to optimize its mix of refined products when processing heavy oil.

== Futures trading ==
For integrated oil companies that control their entire supply chain from oil production to retail distribution of refined products, their business provides a natural economic hedge against adverse price movements. For independent oil refiners which purchase crude oil and sell refined products in the wholesale market, adverse price movements can present a significant economic risk. Given a target optimal product mix, an independent oil refiner can attempt to hedge itself against adverse price movements by buying oil futures and selling futures for its primary refined products according to the proportions of its optimal mix.

For simplicity, most refiners wishing to hedge their price exposures have used a crack ratio usually expressed as X:Y:Z where X represents a number of barrels of crude oil, Y represents a number of barrels of gasoline and Z represents a number of barrels of distillate fuel oil, subject to the constraint that X=Y+Z. This crack ratio is used for hedging purposes by buying X barrels of crude oil and selling Y barrels of gasoline and Z barrels of distillate in the futures market. The crack spread X:Y:Z reflects the spread obtained by trading oil, gasoline and distillate according to this ratio. Widely used crack spreads have included 3:2:1, 5:3:2 and 2:1:1. As the 3:2:1 crack spread is the most popular of these, widely quoted crack spread benchmarks are the "Gulf Coast 3:2:1" and the "Chicago 3:2:1".

Various financial intermediaries in the commodity markets have tailored their products to facilitate trading crack spreads. For example, NYMEX offers virtual crack spread futures contracts by treating a basket of underlying NYMEX futures contracts corresponding to a crack spread as a single transaction. Treating crack spread futures baskets as a single transaction has the advantage of reducing the margin requirements for a crack spread futures position. Other market participants dealing over the counter provide even more customized products.

The following discussion of crack spread contracts comes from the Energy Information Administration publication Derivatives and Risk Management in the Petroleum, Natural Gas, and Electricity Industries:

Refiners’ profits are tied directly to the spread, or difference, between the price of crude oil and the prices of refined products. Because refiners can reliably predict their costs other than crude oil, the spread is their major uncertainty. One way in which a refiner could ensure a given spread would be to buy crude oil futures and sell product futures. Another would be to buy crude oil call options and sell product call options. Both of those strategies are complex, however, and they require the hedger to tie up funds in margin accounts.

To ease this burden, NYMEX in 1994 launched the crack spread contract. NYMEX treats crack spread purchases or sales of multiple futures as a single trade for the purposes of establishing margin requirements. The crack spread contract helps refiners to lock-in a crude oil price and heating oil and unleaded gasoline prices simultaneously in order to establish a fixed refining margin. One type of crack spread contract bundles the purchase of three crude oil futures (30,000 barrels) with the sale a month later of two unleaded gasoline futures (20,000 barrels) and one heating oil future (10,000 barrels). The 3-2-1 ratio approximates the real-world ratio of refinery output—2 barrels of unleaded gasoline and 1 barrel of heating oil from 3 barrels of crude oil. Buyers and sellers concern themselves only with the margin requirements for the crack spread contract. They do not deal with individual margins for the underlying trades.

An average 3-2-1 ratio based on sweet crude is not appropriate for all refiners, however, and the OTC market provides contracts that better reflect the situation of individual refineries. Some refineries specialize in heavy crude oils, while others specialize in gasoline. One thing OTC traders can attempt is to aggregate individual refineries so that the trader’s portfolio is close to the exchange ratios. Traders can also devise swaps that are based on the differences between their clients’ situations and the exchange standards.
