= Creep feeding =

Creep feeding is a method of supplementing the diet of young livestock, primarily in beef calves, by offering feed to animals who are still nursing. Creep feed is sometimes offered to swine, and it is possible with companion grazing animals such as sheep and goats. Creep feeding is used almost exclusively in situations where animal prices are high, feed costs are low, offspring are born in the spring, and the animals are purebred.

Studies show that the use of creep feed consistently causes more rapid growth and a higher weaning weight. However, data also suggests that beef calves that do not receive creep feed may catch up with creep-fed calves' weight post-weaning, so the greatest increase in profits is realized in stocker operations where animals are sold soon after weaning.

The composition of creep feed can vary with the price of the various components, but it is usually has a base of cracked corn, rolled oats, alfalfa, brewer's grain or any combination of these four. Other ingredients can include rolled barley, soybean meal, soybean hulls, molasses, Dicalcium phosphate and mineral salts.

== Beef calves ==
In beef cattle production, profits are derived almost entirely from the weaning weight of the calf. Milk from the mother supplies only half of the nutrients the calf needs to achieve its maximum growth rate and weaning weight. By offering creep feed, both the rate of weight gain and the weaning weight of the calf can be significantly improved. It is used primarily with spring-born calves, as pasture quality at this time is declining, preventing the calf from finding the other 50% of its nutritive needs by grazing.

A calf requires approximately 10% of its body weight in milk daily; for a 100 lb (45 kg) calf, this means 10 pounds (4.5 kg) of milk. As the calf grows, the amount of milk it requires begins to exceed the capacity of its mother to produce the milk. A 500 lb (230 kg) calf requires 50 pounds (23 kg) of milk, but a beef cow only produces approximately 13 pounds (5.9 kg) of milk a day. The 500-lb calf is therefore shorted nearly 40 pounds (18 kg) of milk. This difference is made up for by offering creep feed. However, a calf's rumen is still small and poorly developed - for this reason, creep feed offered to beef calves must be very energy-dense.

Creep feeding calves may not always be economically desirable; farmers must be cautious not to over-invest in creep feed for calves, as an overfed, "fleshy" calf fetches a very low price at market. Creep-feeding is also not recommended for heifers, as excessive weight gain early in life can cause fatty deposits in the calf's udder, resulting in poor milk production in the adult animal.

Creep-fed calves show a very high percentage of marbling at slaughter.

Creep feed in calves is usually offered in a way that allows for calves to free-feed.

== Pigs ==
Creep feeding piglets rarely actually increases their weaning weight, but it does produce pigs who eat more later in life. The younger the age at which creep feed is offered, the stronger the effect is.

== Other animals ==
Creep feeding is commonly used in foals to supplement the mare's milk and reduce stress on both the mare and the foal.
