= Super Bowl indicator =

Theory that stock market performance can predict super bowl winners

The Super Bowl Indicator is a spurious correlation that says that the stock market's performance in a given year can be predicted based on the outcome of the Super Bowl of that year. It was "discovered" by Leonard Koppett in 1978 when he realized that it had never been wrong, until that point. This pseudo-macroeconomic concept states that if a team from the American Football Conference (AFC) wins, then it will be a declining market (or down market), but if a team from the National Football Conference (NFC) or a team that was in the NFL before the NFL/AFL merger wins, it will be a growing market (up market).

As of January 2022, the predictor had been right 41 out of 55 games, a 75% success rate. Without retrospective predictions, i.e. after its invention in 1978, it had been correct in 29 out of 43 games, a success rate of 67%.

== Data ==
Year	Team	League	Conference	Market	Correct
2000	Rams	NFL	NFC	▼	No
2001	Ravens	exp	AFC	▼	Yes
2002	Patriots	AFL	AFC	▼	Yes
2003	Buccaneers	exp	NFC	▲	Yes
2004	Patriots	AFL	AFC	▲	No
2005	Patriots	AFL	AFC	▼	Yes
2006	Steelers	NFL	AFC	▲	No
2007	Colts	NFL	AFC	▲	No
2008	Giants	NFL	NFC	▼	No
2009	Steelers	NFL	AFC	▲	No
2010	Saints	NFL	NFC	▲	Yes
2011	Packers	NFL	NFC	▲	Yes
2012	Giants	NFL	NFC	▲	Yes
2013	Ravens	exp	AFC	▲	No
2014	Seahawks	exp	NFC	▲	Yes
2015	Patriots	AFL	AFC	▼	Yes
2016	Broncos	AFL	AFC	▲	No
2017	Patriots	AFL	AFC	▲	No
2018	Eagles	NFL	NFC	▼	No
2019	Patriots	AFL	AFC	▲	No
2020	Chiefs	AFL	AFC	▲	No
2021	Buccaneers	exp	NFC	▲	Yes
2022	Rams	NFL	NFC	▼	No
2023	Chiefs	AFL	AFC	▲	No
2024	Chiefs	AFL	AFC	▲	No
2025	Eagles	NFL	NFC	▲	Yes

== Statistical significance ==
The Super Bowl Indicator is generally treated as an example of a spurious correlation rather than a reliable forecasting method. Although the indicator appeared to have a high historical success rate in its early years, later analysis has found that its predictive performance weakened substantially after it became widely known.

The indicator has no generally accepted economic mechanism connecting the outcome of a football game with stock-market returns. It is therefore usually cited as a reminder that historical correlations can occur by chance and should not be used as a basis for investment decisions.

== See also ==
- January barometer
- Calendar effect
