= January barometer =

Finance hypothesis

The January barometer ("As goes January, so goes the year") is the hypothesis that stock market performance in January (particularly in the U.S.) predicts its performance for the rest of the year. So if the stock market rises in January, it is likely to continue to rise by the end of December. The January barometer was first mentioned by Yale Hirsch in 1972.

Historically, if the S&P 500 goes up in January, the trend will follow for the rest of the year. Conversely if the S&P falls in January, then it will fall for the rest of the year. From 1950 till 1984 both positive and negative prediction had a certainty of about 70% for positive outcomes and 90% for negative ones respectively with 75% in total. Between 1985 and 2010, however, the negative predictive power had been reduced to 50%, or in other words, no predictive power at all.

== See also ==
- January effect
- Super Bowl indicator
- Cabañuelas, analyzing the weather of January to predict the rest of the year. Part of Hispanic weather lore.
