= United States presidential election cycle =

The four-year United States presidential election cycle is a theory that stock markets are weakest in the year following the election of a new U.S. president. It suggests that the presidential election has a predictable impact on America's economic policies and market sentiment irrespective of the specific policies of the President. It goes on to suggest the levels of stocks for each of the four-years of the presidential term as part of a stock market cycle.

== Theory ==
The four-year U.S. presidential cycle is attributed to politics and its impact on America's economic policies. Either or both of these factors could be the cause for the stock market's statistically improved performance during most of the third and fourth years of a president's four-year term.

The month-end seasonality cycle is attributed to the automatic purchases associated with retirement accounts. The secular stock market cycles that last about 30 years move in lockstep with corresponding secular economic, social, and political cycles in the US.

== See also ==
- Calendar effect
- Market timing
