= Grand supercycle =

Financial term

Proposed economic waves
Cycle/wave name	Period (years)
Kitchin cycle (inventory, e.g. pork cycle)	3–5
Juglar cycle (fixed investment)	7–11
Kuznets swing (infrastructural investment)	15–25
Kondratiev wave (technological basis)	45–60

The Grand Supercycle is the longest period, or wave, in the growth of a financial market as described by the Elliott wave principle, originally conceived and formulated by Ralph Nelson Elliott. Elliott speculated that a Grand Supercycle advance had started in the United States stock market in 1857 and ran to the year 1928, but acknowledged another interpretation that it may have been the third or even the fifth Grand Supercycle wave. However, these assignments have been reevaluated and clarified using larger historical financial data sets in the works of A. J. Frost and R.R. Prechter, and the start is now considered to be 1789, when stock market data began to be recorded.

Like all Elliott waves, Grand Supercycle waves are subdivided into smaller generations of waves. The next smaller generation of waves are those of Supercycle degree. Modern applications of the Wave Principle also describe waves of larger degree spanning millennial periods of time.

Modern application of Elliott wave theory posits that a Grand Supercycle wave five is completing in the 21st century and should be followed by a corrective price pattern of decline that will represent the largest economic recession since the 1700s.

== Possible Elliott wave position of world stock markets ==
Some Elliott wave analysts believe that a Grand Supercycle declining market in US and European stocks started in 1987. When that was proven incorrect it was later revised to be 2000 and then 2006.

During 2006–2007 the Dow Jones Industrial Average reached a new all-time high, which has been interpreted by some Elliott Wave analysts as indicating that 2000–2002 was not the beginning of a Grand Supercycle bear market. However, as this new high was merely a nominal new high in US dollars, and not a new high when measured in ounces of gold other Elliott Wave analysts believe this new high to be 'phony'.

== Expectation of economic recession ==
A controversial issue is whether the severe economic recession accompanying the termination of the current Grand Supercycle will take the form of either a deflationary depression or a hyperinflationary period. Robert Prechter has repeatedly stated that the collapse will take the form of a deflationary depression probably followed by hyperinflation. In an October 2006 interview, when asked to make his case for deflation and the key factors that supported it, Prechter said:

The credit bubble: the fact that we do not have currency inflation as much as we have credit inflation. And credit bubbles have always imploded. The amount of dollars out there that are greenbacks – actual cash – is minuscule compared to the dollar value of credit instruments. So in my view the Fed is utterly powerless to prevent the ultimate deflation of the credit bubble. And some people say, "Well, they can print money." Fine, that would just make the credit bubble collapse faster as soon as bond holders realize that's what they were doing. There's no way out of it. So that's the argument.

Well, the hyperinflation part is a pure guess based on politics. It has nothing to do with reading markets. I think the markets are telegraphing deflation, and I'm very confident about that. Hyperinflation to me is going to be the natural political response. I mean these people in Congress are so irresponsible – except to themselves and their families, of course. They always get reelected so they're doing that correctly. I mean, it's working for them as individuals but it's not working for the country. Anyway, to save their own skins I think the most likely thing is that they will turn to the Treasury, whether they keep the Federal Reserve System or not, and say, "Let's print, let's get the machines going and print those greenbacks and spread them around."

== Controversy ==
Many controversies surround the concept of the Grand Supercycle:

- Stock transactions did not occur during the first years of the United States and price data is thus not available. The notion of the Grand Supercycle was thus implied by R. N. Elliott by linking together gold prices, British stock market prices, and later U.S. stock market prices, as the U.S. economy surpassed the U.K. It is not clear that this methodology is scientifically robust.
- The hypothesized Grand Supercycle is conjectured to span more time than a human life, which some say means it cannot exist. Followers of Saeculum Theory take this view and align instead around a belief that defined sequences of generations relearn approximately the same lessons as their forebears. Similar ideas can be found in the Bible. The Saeculum might map to the Kondratiev cycle.
- The idea of a Grand Supercycle bear market may be interpreted to suggest that mankind will never learn from its past mistakes, or become self-aware in a macro-economic sense. The historical study presented in David Hackett Fischer's The Great Wave (Oxford University Press, 1999), however, presents a meticulously argued case that the periodic crises in human history are becoming steadily less volatile, which suggests that some kind of species-wide learning is occurring.

== See also ==
- Business cycle
- David Hackett Fischer
- Economic cycles
- Market trends
