= Black Wednesday (NHS) =

Date in which new doctors enter the UK National Health Service

In the United Kingdom, Black Wednesday is the first Wednesday of August when newly qualified doctors enter their first postgraduate positions in National Health Service (NHS) hospitals. It is also the day that most resident doctors rotate to different wards to begin new roles. It is thought that this sudden influx of inexperience and unfamiliarity increases the risk of medical errors. A study using retrospective hospital admissions data from 2000 and 2008 found that mortality rates of patients admitted on the first Wednesday of August were 6 - 8% higher than patients admitted on the final Wednesday of July. A similar phenomenon is perceived in the United States, known as the July effect, although several studies have conflicting outcomes as to whether a knock to patient care is observed. Despite a lack of conclusive data, several guidelines have been introduced in the United Kingdom to ensure optimal patient care throughout the changeover season.

== Guidelines ==
In 2012, a letter from Sir Bruce Keogh introduced a mandatory 4-day paid shadowing period for all foundation year 1 (FY1) doctors prior to their official start date. The purpose of this period was for FY1 doctors to gain practical familiarity and comprehensive inductions to their working environment. The shadowing period aimed to enhance performance on the first working day and ultimately improve the safety and efficiency of patient care. The Academy of Medical Royal Colleges in conjunction with NHS Employers, later developed practical recommendations to help mitigate problems associated with patient care during the changeover period. Their goal was to ensure that newly qualified doctors had access to adequate support to practise medicine safely. The four recommendations were as follows:

- Consultants and senior staff must be available to provide support during the changeover period
- Rotas should be designed so that new doctors have access to clinical and educational supervision
- High quality clinical inductions must be conducted
- Reduction of elective work so that staff are available to offer support and guidance

As outlined in their contract, resident doctors must engage fully with all necessary training. To improve compliance of resident doctors to such training and ultimately improve patient care, a novel e-learning induction and training programme was implemented in a district general hospital in South-West England (August 2013). The success of the programme was assessed via a summative test whereby 100 % compliance (n=370) was achieved. Analysis of a subgroup (n=141) concluded that 85.7 % had completed the mandatory training by day 1 (the mean completion time was 3 days prior to day 1 with a standard deviation of 14.2 days) thus helping to put an end to Black Wednesday.

Although various studies both within the United Kingdom and internationally have suggested a knock to patient care during the influx of resident doctors, the actual number of excess deaths during August are very small (45 deaths over nine years). There is no proven link to inexperience - however, action to improve the performance of resident doctors should be taken regardless. Studies have also concluded that there is a systematic difference that fewer patients are admitted during the changeover period than the previous week, suggesting that only critically ill patients are admitted and therefore may skew the results.
