= Elliott wave principle =

Method of market analysis

The Elliott wave principle, or Elliott wave theory, is a form of technical analysis that helps financial traders analyze market cycles and forecast market trends by identifying extremes in investor psychology and price levels, such as highs and lows, by looking for patterns in prices. Ralph Nelson Elliott (1871–1948), an American accountant, developed a model for the underlying social principles of financial markets by studying their price movements, and developed a set of analytical tools in the 1930s. He proposed that market prices unfold in specific patterns, which practitioners today call Elliott waves, or simply waves. Elliott published his theory of market behavior in the book The Wave Principle in 1938, summarized it in a series of articles in Financial World magazine in 1939, and covered it most comprehensively in his final major work, Nature's Laws: The Secret of the Universe in 1946. Elliott stated that "because man is subject to rhythmical procedure, calculations having to do with his activities can be projected far into the future with a justification and certainty heretofore unattainable".

== Foundation ==
The Elliott wave principle posits that collective trader psychology, a form of crowd psychology, moves between optimism and pessimism in repeating sequences of intensity and duration. These mood swings create patterns in the price movements of markets at every degree of trend or time scale.

Elliot wave degrees exhibiting self-similarity (from R. H. Elliot)

According to Elliott's theory, markets move through two phases: a motive (impulsive) phase, where prices move in the direction of the main trend, and a corrective phase, where prices move against the trend, as the illustration shows. Impulses are always subdivided into a set of five lower-degree waves, alternating again between motive and corrective character, so that waves 1, 3, and 5 are impulses, and waves 2 and 4 are smaller retraces of waves 1 and 3 respectively. Corrective waves subdivide into three smaller-degree waves starting with a five-wave counter-trend impulse, a retrace, and another impulse. In a bear market the dominant trend is downward, and the pattern is reversed—five waves down and three up. Motive waves always move with the trend, while corrective waves move against it.

== Wave degree ==
The Elliott wave principle explains that market movements form recurring patterns of five-wave and three-wave structures, which repeat across various timeframes and exhibit fractal-like behavior. Each level of such timescales is called the degree of the wave, or price pattern. Each degree of waves consists of one full cycle of motive and corrective waves. Waves 1, 3, and 5 of each cycle are motive in character, while waves 2 and 4 are corrective. The majority of motive waves ensure forward progress in the direction of the prevailing trend, in bull or bear markets, but yield an overall principle of growth of a market.

The overall movement of a wave one degree higher is upward in a bullish trend. After the initial five waves forward and three waves of correction, the sequence is repeated to a larger degree, and the self-similar fractal geometry continues to unfold. The completed motive pattern comprises 89 waves, followed by a completed corrective pattern of 55 waves.

Each degree of a pattern in a financial market has a name. Practitioners use symbols for each wave to indicate both function and degree. Numbers are used for motive waves, and letters for corrective waves (shown in the highest of the three idealized series of wave structures or degrees). Degrees are not strictly defined by absolute size or duration, but by form. Waves of the same degree may be of very different size or duration.

While exact time spans may vary, the customary order of degrees is reflected in the following sequence:

- Grand supercycle: multi-century
- Supercycle: multi-decade (about 40–70 years)
- Cycle: one year to several years, or even several decades under an Elliott extension
- Primary: a few months to two years
- Intermediate: weeks to months
- Minor: weeks
- Minute: days
- Minuette: hours
- Subminuette: minutes

Some analysts specify additional smaller and larger degrees.

== Wave personality and characteristics ==
Elliott wave analysts (or Elliotticians) hold that each individual wave has its own signature or characteristic, which typically reflects the psychology of the moment. Understanding those personalities is key to the application of the wave principle; they are defined below. (Definitions assume a bull market in equities; the characteristics apply in reverse in bear markets.)

Five wave pattern (dominant trend)	Three wave pattern (corrective trend)
Wave 1: Wave one is rarely obvious at its inception. When the first wave of a new bull market begins, the fundamental news is almost universally negative. The previous trend is considered still strongly in force. Fundamental analysts continue to revise their earnings estimates lower; the economy probably does not look strong. Sentiment surveys are decidedly bearish, put options are in vogue, and implied volatility in the options market is high. Volume might increase a bit as prices rise, but not by enough to alert many technical analysts.	Wave A: Corrections are typically harder to identify than impulse moves. In wave A of a bear market, the fundamental news is usually still positive. Most analysts see the drop as a correction in a still-active bull market. Some technical indicators that accompany wave A include increased volume, rising implied volatility in the options markets and possibly a turn higher in open interest in related futures markets.
Wave 2: Wave two corrects wave one, but can never extend beyond the starting point of wave one. Typically, the news is still bad. As prices retest the prior low, bearish sentiment quickly builds, and "the crowd" haughtily reminds all that the bear market is still deeply ensconced. Still, some positive signs appear for those who are looking: volume should be lower during wave two than during wave one, prices usually do not retrace more than 61.8% of the wave one gains, and prices should fall in a three wave pattern.	Wave B: Prices reverse higher, which many see as a resumption of the now long-gone bull market. Those familiar with classical technical analysis may see the peak as the right shoulder of a head and shoulders reversal pattern. The volume during wave B should be lower than in wave A. By this point, fundamentals are probably no longer improving, but they most likely have not yet turned negative.
Wave 3: Wave three is usually the largest and most powerful wave in a trend (although some research suggests that in commodity markets, wave five is the largest). The news is now positive and fundamental analysts start to raise earnings estimates. Prices rise quickly, corrections are short-lived and shallow. Anyone looking to "get in on a pullback" will likely miss the boat. As wave three starts, the news is probably still bearish, and most market players remain negative; but by wave three's midpoint, "the crowd" will often join the new bullish trend. Wave three often extends wave one by a ratio of 1.618:1.	Wave C: Prices move impulsively lower in five waves. Volume picks up, and by the third leg of wave C, almost everyone realizes that a bear market is firmly entrenched. Wave C is typically at least as large as wave A and often extends to 1.618 times wave A or beyond.
Wave 4: Wave four is typically clearly corrective. Prices may meander sideways for an extended period, and wave four typically retraces less than 38.2% of wave three (see Fibonacci relationships below). Volume is well below that of wave three. This is a good place to buy a pullback if you understand the potential ahead for wave 5. Still, fourth waves are often frustrating because of their lack of progress in the larger trend.	
Wave 5: Wave five is the final leg in the direction of the dominant trend. The news is almost universally positive and everyone is bullish. Unfortunately, this is when many average investors finally buy in, right before the top. Volume is often lower in wave five than in wave three, and many momentum indicators start to show divergences (prices reach a new high but the indicators do not reach a new peak). At the end of a major bull market, bears may very well be ridiculed (recall how forecasts for a top in the stock market during 2000 were received).

== Pattern recognition and fractals ==
Elliott's theory relies on analyzing price charts to identify wave patterns, which are fractal in nature, meaning they repeat across different timeframes, and discern what prices may do next; thus, the application of the Wave Principle is a form of pattern recognition.

The structures Elliott described meet the common definition of a fractal (self-similar patterns appearing at every degree of trend). Elliott wave practitioners argue that just as naturally occurring fractals often expand and grow more complex over time, the model shows that collective human psychology develops in natural patterns, via buying and selling decisions reflected in market prices: "It's as though we are somehow programmed by mathematics. Seashell, galaxy, snowflake, or human: we're all bound by the same order." Critics, however, argue it is a form of pareidolia.

== Wave rules and guidelines ==
A correct Elliott wave count must observe three rules:

- Wave 2 never retraces more than 100% of wave 1.
- Wave 3 cannot be the shortest of the three impulse waves, namely waves 1, 3, and 5.
- Wave 4 never enters the price territory of wave 1

A common guideline called "alternation" observes that in a five-wave pattern, waves 2 and 4 often take alternate forms; a simple sharp move in wave 2, for example, suggests a complex mild move in wave 4. Alternation can occur in impulsive and corrective waves. Elliott observed that alternate waves of the same degree must be distinctive and unique in price, time, severity, and construction. All formations can guide influences on market action. The time period covered by each formation, however, is the major deciding factor in the full manifestation of the Rule of Alternation. A sharp counter-trend correction in wave 2 covers a short distance in horizontal units. This should produce a sideways counter-trend correction in wave 4, covering a longer distance in horizontal units, and vice versa. Alternation provides analysts a notice of what not to expect when analyzing wave formations.

Corrective wave patterns unfold in forms known as zigzags, flats, or triangles. In turn, these corrective patterns can come together to form more complex corrections. Similarly, a triangular corrective pattern is formed usually in wave 4 but very rarely in wave 2 and is the indication of the end of a correction.

== Fibonacci relationships ==
R. N. Elliott's analysis of the mathematical properties of waves and patterns eventually led him to conclude that "The Fibonacci Summation Series is the basis of The Wave Principle". Numbers from the Fibonacci sequence surface repeatedly in Elliott wave structures, including motive waves (1, 3, 5), a single full cycle (8 waves), and the completed motive (89 waves) and corrective (55 waves) patterns. Elliott developed his market model before he realized that it reflects the Fibonacci sequence. "When I discovered the Wave Principle action of market trends, I had never heard of either the Fibonacci Series or the Pythagorean Diagram".

The Fibonacci sequence is also closely connected to the Golden ratio (1.618). Practitioners commonly use this ratio and related ratios to establish support and resistance levels for market waves, namely the price points which help define the parameters of a trend. See Fibonacci retracement.

Finance professor Roy Batchelor and researcher Richard Ramyar, a former director of the United Kingdom Society of Technical Analysts and formerly Global Head of Research at Lipper and Thomson Reuters Wealth Management, studied whether Fibonacci ratios appear non-randomly in the stock market, as Elliott's model predicts. The researchers said the "idea that prices retrace to a Fibonacci ratio or round fraction of the previous trend clearly lacks any scientific rationale". They also said, "There is no significant difference between the frequencies with which price and time ratios occur in cycles in the Dow Jones Industrial Average, and frequencies which we would expect to occur at random in such a time series".

== After Elliott ==
Following Elliott's death in 1948, other market technicians and financial professionals continued to use the wave principle and provide forecasts to investors. Charles Collins, who had published Elliott's "Wave Principle" and helped introduce Elliott's theory to Wall Street, stated that Elliott's contributions to technical analysis were as significant as those of Charles Dow.

Hamilton Bolton, founder of The Bank Credit Analyst, espoused wave analysis to a wide readership in the 1950s and 1960s in his annual market commentaries and forecasts.

Bolton introduced the wave principle to A. J. Frost (1908–1999), who provided weekly financial commentary on the Financial News Network in the 1980s. Over the course of his lifetime, Frost's contributions to the field were of great significance, and today the Canadian Society of Technical Analysts awards the A. J. Frost Memorial Award to someone each year who has also made a significant contribution to the field of technical analysis.

== Adoption and use ==
Robert Prechter found Elliott's work while employed as a market technician at Merrill Lynch in the 1970s. His self-published market newsletter prominently featured his Elliott wave analysis during the bull market of the 1980s, giving his views exposure among followers of technical analysis.

== Criticism ==
Benoit Mandelbrot, who developed mathematical models of market pricing based on fractal geometry, expressed caution about the validity of wave models:

But Wave prediction is a very uncertain business. It is an art to which the subjective judgment of the chartists matters more than the objective, replicable verdict of the numbers. The record of this, as of most technical analysis, is at best mixed.

Critics warn that the wave principle is too vague to be useful, since practitioners cannot consistently identify the beginning or end of waves, resulting in forecasts prone to subjective revisions. Technical analyst David Aronson wrote:

The Elliott wave principle, as popularly practiced, is not a legitimate theory, but a story, and a compelling one that is eloquently told by Robert Prechter. The account is especially persuasive because EWP has the seemingly remarkable ability to fit any segment of market history down to its most minute fluctuations. I contend this is made possible by the method's loosely defined rules and the ability to postulate a large number of nested waves of varying magnitude. This gives the Elliott analyst the same freedom and flexibility that allowed pre-Copernican astronomers to explain all observed planet movements even though their underlying theory of an Earth-centered universe was wrong.

Some analysts consider the Elliott wave principle as too dated to be applicable in today's markets, as explained by financial market analyst Glenn Neely, author of Mastering Elliott Wave:

Elliott wave was an incredible discovery for its time. But, as technologies, governments, economies, and social systems have changed, the behavior of people has also. These changes have affected the wave patterns R. N. Elliott discovered. Consequently, strict application of orthodox Elliott wave concepts to current day markets skews forecasting accuracy. Markets have evolved, but Elliott has not.

== See also ==
- Behavioral economics
- Business cycle
- Demarcation problem
- The Wisdom of Crowds
- Kondratiev wave
- Weierstrass function
