= Gross processing margin =

Term in economics

In commodities industries, the gross processing margin (GPM) refers to the difference between the cost of a commodity and the combined sales income of the finished products that result from processing the commodity.

Various industries have formulas to express the relationship of raw material costs to sales income from finished products.

== Industry examples and related spreads ==
Gross processing margin is a general concept that appears in different commodity industries under more specific names. CME Group notes, for example, that in soybean processing the relevant relationship is often called the soybean crush, in which soybeans are processed into soybean meal and soybean oil and the margin reflects the difference between input costs and the combined value of those processed outputs.

In livestock markets, a related concept is the gross feeding margin, which measures the difference between the value of purchased inputs and the value of the finished livestock sold. CME Group's discussion of cattle feeding spreads describes this as the economic margin modeled by combining feeder cattle, corn, and live cattle prices, and notes that such spreads are used both to estimate profitability and to manage margin risk.
