= Santa Claus rally =

Annual stock market calendar effect

A Santa Claus rally is a calendar effect that involves a rise in stock prices during the last 5 trading days in December and the first 2 trading days in the following January. According to the 2019 Stock Trader's Almanac, the stock market has risen 1.3% on average during the 7 trading days in the period since both 1950 and 1969. Over the 7 trading days in this period, stock prices have historically risen 76% of the time, which is far more than the average performance over a 7-day period.

However, in the weeks prior to Christmas, stock prices have not gone up more than at other times of the year.

In 2024-2025, the S&P 500 completed a reverse Santa Claus rally by selling off during every business day between Christmas and New Year’s, a historic first for the index.

The Santa Claus rally was first recorded by Yale Hirsch in his Stock Trader's Almanac in 1972.

The Dow Jones Industrial Average has performed better in years following holiday seasons in which the Santa Claus rally does not materialize.

== Causes ==
There is no generally accepted explanation for the phenomenon. The rally is sometimes attributed to the following:

- Increased investor purchases in anticipation of the January effect
- Lighter volume due to holiday vacations makes it easier to move the market higher
- A slow down in tax-loss harvesting that depresses prices at the beginning of December
- Short sellers / pessimistic investors tend to take vacations around the holidays
