= Subwave (band) =

Musical group

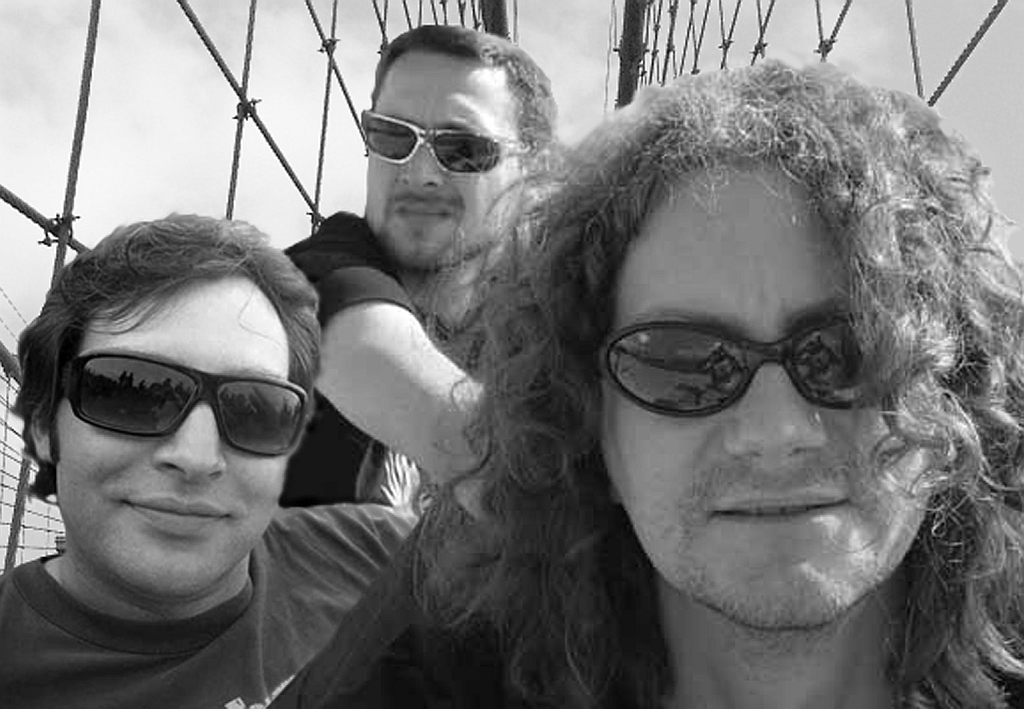
- Frank Schoofs, Moritz Kruedener, Sven Kartscher

Background information
- Origin: Nuremberg, Bavaria, Germany
- Genres: Alternative rock, post-grunge, indie
- Years active: 1997–present
- Labels: Burrofeliz, Subwave-Music
- Members: Sven Kartscher vocals, guitar Frank Schoofs vocals, bass guitar Moritz Kruedener vocals, drums

Subwave is an alternative rock band from Nuremberg/Germany.

== History ==
The band was set up 1997 by Sven Kartscher (voc/git), Guido Seibelt (dr) und Felix Schnetzer (bs) and published their first studio album in the year 2000 ironically titled Kurt Cobain.

After finishing of the production of their second album Reject in 2002 the line-up changed when F. Schnetzer und G. Seibelt left the band. After many changeovers over the years, in 2005 Patrik Leuchauer (bs) and Moritz Kruedener (dr) joined in as new band members.

Several of their songs were published on German and international compilations, were put on the play lists of national stations and got airplay even at college-radios overseas.

Meanwhile, Kai Wingenfelder (singer of the popular German rock band Fury in the Slaughterhouse) noticed Subwave and became their producer to offer them a record deal in 2006 on his own label Burrofeliz and the band recorded 2007 their third album named Fast Forward in the Goldgrube record studio.

In autumn 2008 a maxi cd titled The End of our Days announced their new upcoming fourth album. Short after the release Rik Leuchauer left the band and was replaced by the new bass player Frank Schoofs, but both were involved in the recordings of the new album with the slightly ironic name A Tribute to.... The record is often presented as a kind of greatest hits collection.

== Discography ==
=== Full length records ===
- A Tribute to..., 2009 by Subwave/Burrofeliz
- The End of our Days (Maxi), 2008 by Subwave/Burrofeliz
- FAST FORWARD, 2007 by Burrofeliz/SPV
- REJECT, 2002 by Subwave/OSP
- KURT COBAIN, 2000 by Subwave

=== Compilations ===
- BEST OF INDEPENDENT by One Kind Radio/Chicago
- Independent Compilation by Anty-Industry/USA
- HITPACK Vol. 1 by Deshima-Music
- COLLEGE - ALTERNATIVE Vol. 1 by CDReview
- FINEST NOISE Vol. 6 by BluNoise
