= Dry matter =

Mass of a completely dried material

The dry matter or dry weight is a measure of the mass of a completely dried substance.

== Analysis of food ==
The dry matter of plant and animal material consists of all its constituents excluding water. The dry matter of food includes carbohydrates, fats, proteins, vitamins, minerals, and antioxidants (e.g., thiocyanate, anthocyanin, and quercetin). Carbohydrates, fats, and proteins, which provide the energy in foods (measured in kilocalories or kilojoules), make up ninety percent of the dry weight of a diet.

=== Water composition ===
Water content in foods varies widely. A large number of foods are more than half water by weight, including boiled oatmeal (84.5%), cooked macaroni (78.4%), boiled eggs (73.2%), boiled rice (72.5%), white meat chicken (70.3%) and sirloin steak (61.9%). Fruits and vegetables are 70 to 95% water. Most meats are on average about 70% water. Breads are approximately 36% water. Some foods have a water content of less than 5%, e.g., peanut butter, crackers, and chocolate cake. Water content of dairy products is quite variable. Butter is 15% water. Cow's milk ranges between 88 and 86% water. Swiss cheese is 37% percent water. The water content of milk and dairy products varies with the percentage of butterfat so that whole milk has the lowest percentage of water and skimmed milk has the highest.

=== Dry matter basis ===
The nutrient or mineral content of foods, animal feeds or plant tissues are often expressed on a dry matter basis, i.e. as a proportion of the total dry matter in the material. For example, a 138-gram apple contains 84% water (116 g water and 22 g dry matter per apple). The potassium content is 0.72% on a dry matter basis, i.e. 0.72% of the dry matter is potassium. The apple, therefore, contains 158 mg potassium (0.72/100 X 22 g). Dried apple contains the same concentration of potassium on a dry matter basis (0.72%), but is only 32% water (68% dry matter). So 138 g of dried apple contains 93.8 g dry matter and 675 mg potassium (0.72/100 x 93.8 g).

When formulating a diet or mixed animal feed, nutrient or mineral concentrations are generally given on a dry matter basis; it is therefore important to consider the moisture content of each constituent when calculating total quantities of the different nutrients supplied.

=== Fat in dry matter (FDM) ===
Cheese contains both dry matter and water. The dry matter in cheese contains proteins, butterfat, minerals, and lactose (milk sugar), although little lactose survives fermentation when the cheese is made. A cheese's fat content is expressed as the percentage of fat in the cheese's dry matter (abbreviated FDM or FiDM), which excludes the cheese's water content. For example, if a cheese is 50% water (and, therefore, 50% dry matter) and has 25% fat, its fat content would be 50% fat in dry matter.

== Techniques ==
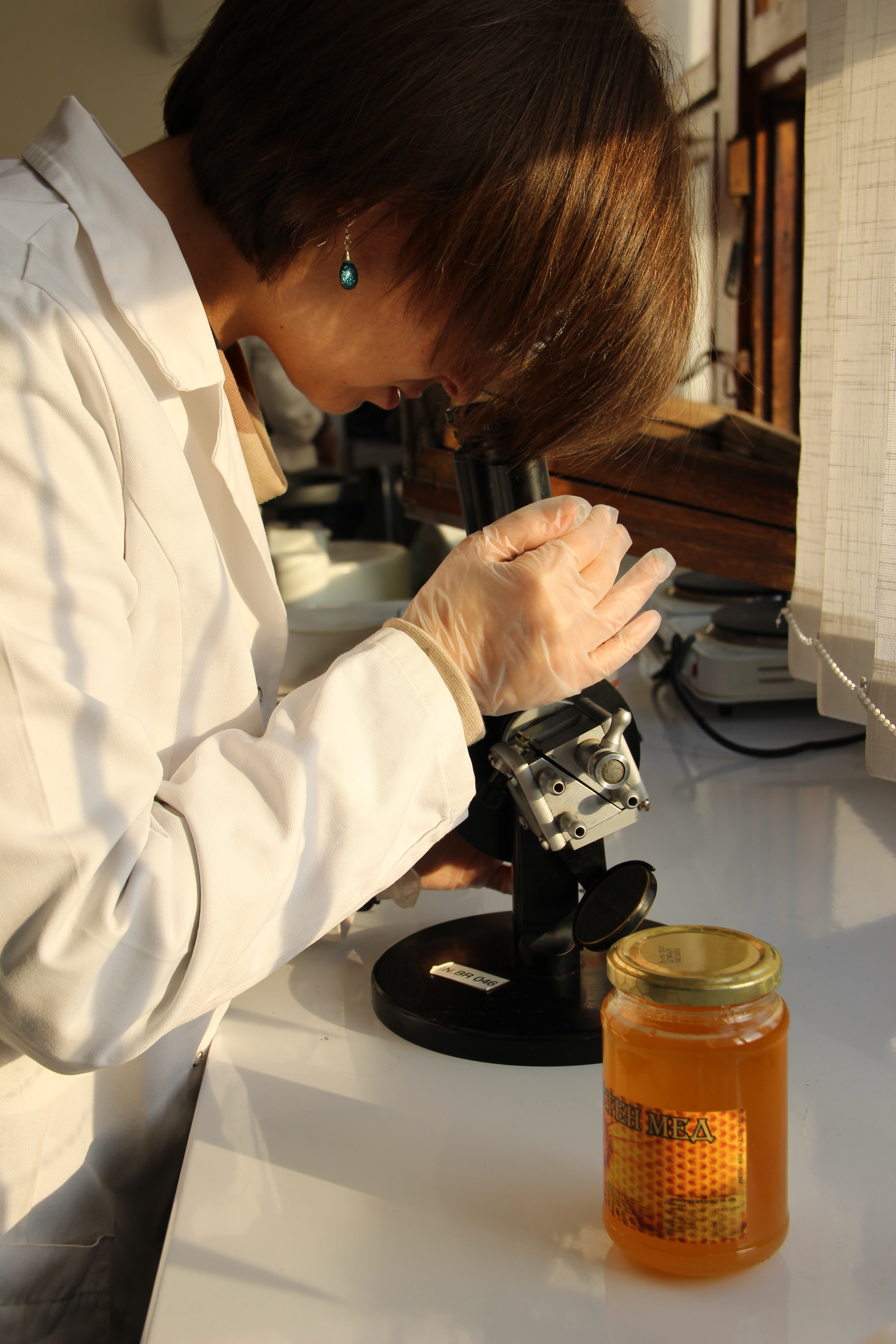
Preparation of a sample of honey on a prism for a refractometric analysis in order to detect the percentage of dry mass

In the sugar industry the dry matter content is an important parameter to control the crystallization process and is often measured on-line by means of microwave density meters.

== Animal feed ==
Dry matter can refer to the dry portion of animal feed. A substance in the feed, such as a nutrient or toxin, can be referred to on a dry matter basis (abbreviated DMB) to show its level in the feed (e.g., ppm). Considering nutrient levels in different feeds on a dry matter basis (rather than an as-is basis) makes a comparison easier because feeds contain different percentages of water. This also allows a comparison between the level of a given nutrient in dry matter and the level needed in an animal's diet. Dry matter intake (DMI) refers to feed intake excluding its water content. The percentage of water is frequently determined by heating the feed on a paper plate in a microwave oven or using the Koster Tester to dry the feed. Ascertaining DMI can be useful for low-energy feeds with a high percentage of water in order to ensure adequate energy intake. Animals eating these kinds of feeds have been shown to consume less dry matter and food energy. A problem called dry matter loss can result from heat generation, as caused by microbial respiration. It decreases the content of nonstructural carbohydrate, protein, and food energy.

== See also ==
- Body water
- Moisture
