= Ralph Nelson Elliott =

American accountant and finance author

- Born: July 28, 1871; Marysville, Kansas, U.S.
- Died: January 15, 1948 (aged 76)
- Occupation: Accountant
- Known for: Wave Principle

Ralph Nelson Elliott (28 July 1871 – 15 January 1948) was an American accountant and author whose study of stock market data led him to develop the Wave Principle, a description of the cyclical nature of trader psychology and a form of technical analysis. These cyclical patterns in price movements are known among practitioners of the method as Elliott waves.

== Personal life and career ==
Elliott was born in Marysville, Kansas, and later moved to San Antonio, Texas. He entered the accounting field in the mid-1890s and worked primarily in executive positions for railroad companies in Central America and Mexico. In 1903, Elliott married Mary Elizabeth Fitzpatrick (1869–1941), who accompanied him during his extended time working as an expatriate in Mexico. Civil unrest there brought the couple back to the United States and eventually to a residence in New York City, where Elliott started a consulting business. In 1924, the United States Department of State appointed Elliott to the post of Chief Accountant for Nicaragua, which was under American control at the time. Not long afterward, Elliott wrote two books based on his professional experiences: Tea Room and Cafeteria Management and The Future of Latin America.

== Elliott Wave Principle ==
In the early 1930s, Elliott began a systematic study of seventy-five years of stock market data, including index charts with increments ranging from yearly to half-hourly prices. In August 1938, he detailed his results by publishing his third book in collaboration with Charles J. Collins, entitled The Wave Principle. Elliott believed that, while stock market prices may appear random and unpredictable, they follow predictable patterns that can be measured and forecast using Fibonacci numbers. Soon after the publication of The Wave Principle, Financial World magazine commissioned Elliott to write twelve articles under the book title, describing his method of market forecasting.

In the early 1940s, Elliott expanded the theory to apply to all collective human behavior. His final major work was his most comprehensive: Nature's Law –The Secret of the Universe published in June, 1946, two years before he died.
