= Stock market cycle =

Stock market cycles are proposed patterns that proponents argue may exist in stock markets. Many such cycles have been proposed, such as tying stock market changes to political leadership, or fluctuations in commodity prices. Some stock market designs are universally recognized (e.g., rotations between the dominance of value investing or growth stocks). However, many academics and professional investors are skeptical of any theory claiming to identify or predict stock market cycles precisely. Some sources argue identifying any such patterns as a "cycle" is a misnomer, because of their non-cyclical nature. Economists using efficient-market hypothesis say that asset prices reflect all available information meaning that it is impossible to systematically beat the market by taking advantage of such cycles.

Changes in stock returns are primarily determined by external factors such as the U.S. monetary policy, the economy, inflation, exchange rates, and socioeconomic conditions (e.g., the 2020-2021 coronavirus pandemic). Intellectual capital does not affect a company stock's current earnings. Intellectual capital contributes to a stock's return growth.

Economist Milton Friedman believed that for the most part, excluding very large supply shocks, business declines are more of a monetary phenomenon. Despite the often-applied term cycles, the fluctuations in business economic activity do not exhibit uniform or predictable periodicity.

According to standard theory, a decrease in price will result in less supply and more demand, while an increase in price will do the opposite. This works well for most assets but it often works in reverse for stocks due to the mistake many investors make of buying high in a state of euphoria and selling low in a state of fear or panic as a result of the herding instinct. In case an increase in price causes an increase in demand, or a decrease in price causes an increase in supply, this destroys the expected negative feedback loop and prices will be unstable. This can be seen in a bubble or crash.

== Publications ==
- Conference Board - Consumer Confidence, Conference Board’s Present Situation Index - Major turns in the Conference Board's Present Situation Index tend to precede corresponding turns in the unemployment rate—particularly at business cycle peaks (that is, going into recessions). Major upturns in the index also tend to foreshadow cyclical peaks in the unemployment rate, which often occur well after the end of a recession. Another useful feature of the index that can be gleaned from the charts is its ability to signal sustained downturns in payroll employment. Whenever the year-over-year change in this index has turned negative by more than 15 points, the economy has entered into a recession. The most useful methods to predict business cycle use methods similar to the organization as Eurostat, OECD and Conference Board.
- Federal Reserve Bank of Chicago - Chicago Fed National Activity Index (CFNAI) Diffusion Index - The Chicago Fed National Activity Index (CFNAI) Diffusion Index is a macroeconomic model of Business Cycle Models. [When passing through a value of -0.35, the] “CFNAI Diffusion Index signals the beginnings and ends of [ NBER ] recessions on average one month earlier than the CFNAI-MA3.” ... the crossing of a -0.35 threshold by the CFNAI Diffusion Index signaled an increased likelihood of the beginning (from above) and end of a recession (from below)...,
- Federal Reserve Bank of Philadelphia - Aruoba-Diebold-Scotti Business Conditions Index (ADS Index) - is published by the Federal Reserve Bank of Philadelphia. The average value of the ADS index is zero. Progressively bigger positive values indicate progressively better-than-average conditions, whereas progressively more negative values indicate progressively worse-than-average conditions.
- Federal Reserve Bank of New York - Yield Curve - the slope of the yield curve is one of the most powerful predictors of future economic growth, inflation, and recessions.,
- BofA Merrill Lynch - Global Wave - has indicators from around the world such as industrial confidence, consumer confidence, estimate revisions, producer prices, capacity utilization, earnings revisions, and credit spreads. When the Global Wave troughs, THEN the MSCI All Country World equity index is up 14% on average over the next 12 months.
- JP Morgan - Equities tend to do well in environments featuring rising growth rates as well as falling inflation. S&P 500 return = 9.80% - 6.44 x Max [0, -1.26% - annual change of the GDP growth rate in %]. R^{2} = 22.4%.

== See also ==
- Technical analysis
- Market timing
- Bottom (technical analysis)
- Market trends and Trend following
- Histoire des bourses de valeurs (French)
