= Sell in May =

Investment strategy for stocks

Sell in May and go away is an investment strategy for stocks based on a theory (sometimes known as the Halloween indicator) that the period from November to April inclusive has significantly stronger stock market growth on average than the other months. In such strategies, stock holdings are sold or minimized at about the start of May and the proceeds held in cash (e.g. a money market fund); stocks are bought again in the autumn, typically around Halloween. "Sell in May" can be characterized as the belief that it is better to avoid holding stock during the summer period.

Though this seasonality is often mentioned informally, it has largely been ignored in academic circles. Analysis by Bouman and Jacobsen (2002) shows that the effect has indeed occurred in 36 out of 37 countries examined, and since the 17th century (1694) in the United Kingdom. The effect is strongest in Europe.

== Causes ==
Data show that stock market returns in many countries during the May–October period are systematically negative or lower than the short-term interest rate. This appears to invalidate the efficient-market hypothesis (EMH), which predicts that any such returns (e.g., from shorting the market) would be bid away by those who accept the phenomenon. Alternative causes include small sample size or time variation in expected stock market returns. EMH predicts that stock market returns should not be predictably lower than the short-term interest rate (risk free rate).

Popular media consider this phenomenon each May, generally rejecting it. However, the effect has been strongly present in most developed markets (including the United Kingdom, the United States, Canada, Japan, and most European countries).

== Academic response ==
Maberly and Pierce extended the data to April 2003 and tested the strategy for April 1982 through April 2003 except for two months, October 1987 and August 1998 (when markets crashed). They found the strategy did not work well in the time period April 1982–September 1987, November 1987–July 1998 or September 1998–April 2003. Other regression models using the same data but controlling for extreme outliers found the effect to be significant.

A follow-up study by Andrade, Chhaochharia and Fuerst (2012) found that the seasonal pattern persisted. In the 1998–2012 sample on average November–April they found that returns are larger than May–October returns in all 37 markets they studied. On average, the difference is equal to about 10 percentage points. The magnitude of the difference is the same in both studies. Further backtesting by Mebane Faber found the effect as early as 1950.

== See also ==
- Market timing
- Calendar effect
- July effect
