= John P. Reese =

American writer

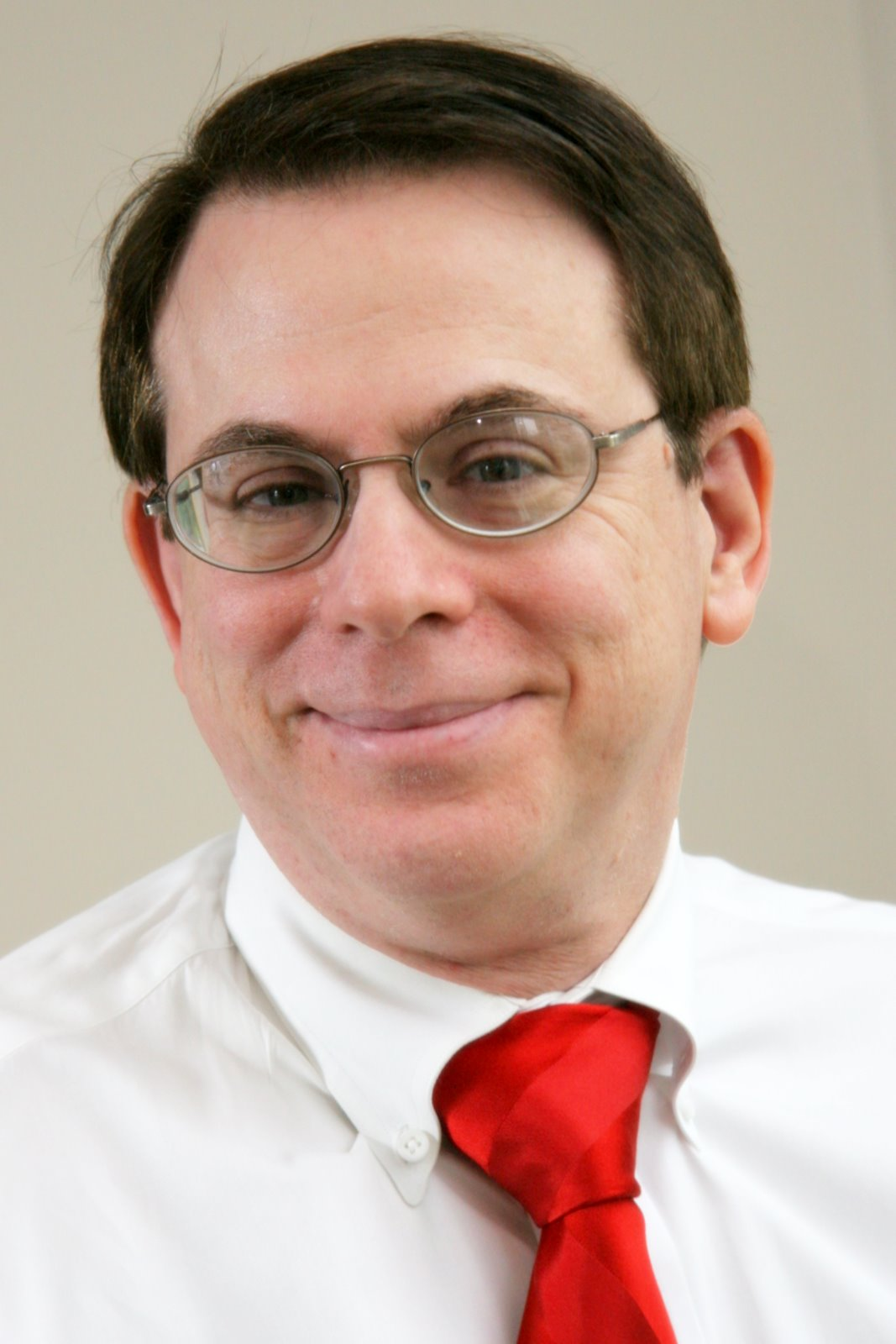
- Reese in 2008
- Born: July 1, 1953 (age 73); Los Angeles, Calif., U.S.
- Education: Massachusetts Institute of Technology, Harvard Business School
- Occupations: Investment analysts and author
- Known for: Co-Founder and CEO, Validea Capital Management, LLC; Validea.com
- Website: www.validea.com

John P. Reese (born July 1, 1953) is an American author, financial columnist, and money manager. He has written two books about investing, and is a columnist for several international financial publications, including Forbes magazine and Forbes.com; Canada's The Globe and Mail; RealMoney.com; and the Israeli newspaper Globes.

Reese has developed computer models that are based on the published strategies of several financial strategists, including Warren Buffett, Peter Lynch, Benjamin Graham, Martin Zweig, and Kenneth Fisher. He holds two patents in the field of automated stock analysis: "Computer based device to report the results of codified methodologies of financial advisors applied to a single security or element" U.S. patent 6,370,516; and "Magazine, online, and broadcast summary recommendation reporting system to aid in decision making" U.S. patent 6,236,980.

Reese is also the founder and chief executive officer of Validea.com, a research website that allows visitors to use his screening tools, and Validea Capital Management, an investment advisory firm. He advises two mutual funds offered in Canada, National Bank Consensus American Equity Fund and National Bank Consensus International Equity Fund.

== Early life and education ==
John P. Reese was born on July 1, 1953, in Los Angeles, California. He attended Hollywood High School in Hollywood, California, before going to MIT and Harvard Business School.

Reese attended the Massachusetts Institute of Technology and graduated with a degree in electrical engineering in 1974. At MIT, he was a member of the school’s artificial intelligence laboratory. In 1979, he received his Master’s in Business Administration from Harvard Business School.

== Career ==
Prior to his investing career, Reese served as marketing manager of electronics at Coleco and vice president of information technology for GE Capital ITS. He also founded and served as CEO of Micro Networks of America, a Farmington, Conn.-based computer networking firm, before selling the company to AmeriData Inc. in 1993.

Reese founded The Reese Group in the late 1990s. Initially, the site served as a report card for financial commentators, monitoring how well the recommendations of dozens of investment columnists and personalities fared. The company's name was later changed to Validea.com. The firm's focus was also changed to feature Reese's stock-selection models. As of April 2011, Validea.com featured models based on published books or papers from 11 different investors with long-term track records of generating above-market-average returns and quantifiable investment strategies. Those investors include: Peter Lynch, Benjamin Graham, William O'Neil, Warren Buffett, David Dreman, Martin Zweig, Kenneth Fisher, James O'Shaughnessy, John Neff, Joseph Piotroski, and The Motley Fool. Reese is the chief executive officer of Validea.com.

In 2004, Reese co-founded Validea Capital Management where he became the CEO, and which manages money for high-net-worth individuals and institutions using his computer models. In 2014 Reese became the co-portfolio-manager of an actively managed exchange-traded fund (ETF) launched by Validea Capital. The fund was the first to directly give investors exposure to the methodologies used by some of Wall Street’s successful investors.

== Published work ==
Reese has co-authored two books on investment strategies. The Guru Investor: How to Beat the Market Using History's Best Investment Strategies (February 3, 2009, John Wiley & Sons. ISBN 978-0470377093) was co-authored by Jack M. Forehand and examines the approaches used by 10 stock strategists: Benjamin Graham, John Neff, David Dreman, Warren Buffett, Peter Lynch, Kenneth Fisher, Martin Zweig, James O'Shaughnessy, Joel Greenblatt, and Joseph Piotroski.

His first book, The Market Gurus: Stock Investing Strategies You Can Use From Wall Street's Best (Dearborn, 2002. ISBN 978-0976510109), was co-authored with Todd O. Glassman and examined the strategies of eight different stock market investors—Peter Lynch, Benjamin Graham, William O'Neil, Warren Buffett, David Dreman, Martin Zweig, Kenneth Fisher, and James O'Shaughnessy.

In addition, Reese is a regular columnist for the financial websites Forbes.com, Nasdaq.com, and RealMoney.com. He writes for two international publications, Israel's Globes and Canada's The Globe and Mail.
