= Ed Yardeni =

Israeli-American economist

Edward Yardeni
- Born: March 15, 1950; Haifa, Israel

Academic background
- Education: Cornell University; Yale University (PhD)

Academic work
- Notable ideas: Fed model; Bond vigilante

Edward Yardeni (born March 15, 1950) is an Israeli-born American economist and the president of Yardeni Research, which offers economic research and recommendations to clients. He is also the former chief economist for EF Hutton, Prudential Securities, and C. J. Lawrence.

Yardeni is known for coining the "Fed model", a disputed theory of equity valuation, as well as the term "bond vigilante". He generally predicts a positive market trend for the stock market, although his predictions in 1999 of disruptions due to the Year 2000 problem were incorrect.

== Biography ==
Yardeni was born in Haifa, Israel. His father worked as an engineer and his mother as a teacher. When he was 7, his family moved to the United States, first settling in Cleveland, Ohio, then Campbell, California, and New Rochelle, New York. He attended Cornell University, and earned a PhD in economics from Yale University. He taught at Columbia Business School after graduation, and also had stints working for the Federal Reserve Bank of New York, Federal Reserve Board of Governors, and the United States Department of the Treasury.

In 1988, he predicted that the Dow Jones Industrial Average would reach 5,000 by 1993 and in 1995, he predicted that it would reach 10,000 by the year 2000.

In 1991, he was named chief economist for C. J. Lawrence after 9 years at Prudential Securities.

In 1998, he was named as having done the best job of forecasting the nation's economy for last quarter of 1997 in a semiannual survey conducted by The Wall Street Journal.

In the late 1990s, Yardeni coined the "Fed model", a disputed theory of equity valuation that compares the stock market's forward earnings yield to the nominal interest rate on long-term government bonds, and that the stock market – as a whole – is fairly valued, when the one-year forward-looking I/B/E/S earnings yield equals the 10-year nominal Treasury yield; deviations suggest over-or-under valuation. He first used the term when commenting on a report on the July 1997 Humphrey-Hawkins testimony by the then-Fed Chair, Alan Greenspan on equity valuations. In 2014, Yardeni noted that the predictive power of the Fed model stopped working almost as soon as he noted the relationship.

In 1999, Yardeni predicted that the Year 2000 problem would cause a recession by disrupting global supply chains. In January 2000, after no major issues occurred, he admitted he had been wrong.

In January 2007, he founded Yardeni Research.

In 2024, he predicted that the second presidency of Donald Trump will spur the S&P 500 to reach 10,000 by the end of the decade.

== Books ==
- Predicting the Markets: A Professional Autobiography (2018)
- In Praise of Profits! (2021)
