= Contrarian investing =

Investment strategy

Contrarian investing is an investment strategy that is characterized by purchasing and selling in contrast to the prevailing sentiment of the time.

A contrarian believes that certain crowd behavior among investors can lead to exploitable mispricings in securities markets. For example, widespread pessimism about a stock can drive a price so low that it overstates the company's risks, and understates its prospects for returning to profitability. Identifying and purchasing such distressed stocks, and selling them after the company recovers, can lead to above-average gains. Conversely, widespread optimism can result in unjustifiably high valuations that will eventually lead to drops, when those high expectations do not pan out. Avoiding investments in over-hyped investments reduces the risk of such drops. These general principles can apply whether the investment in question is an individual stock, an industry sector, or an entire market or any other asset class.

Some contrarians have a permanent bear market view, while the majority of investors bet on the market going up. However, a contrarian does not necessarily have a negative view of the overall stock market, nor do they have to believe that it is always overvalued, or that the conventional wisdom is always wrong. Rather, a contrarian seeks opportunities to buy or sell specific investments when the majority of investors appear to be doing the opposite, to the point where that investment has become mispriced. While more "buy" candidates are likely to be identified during market declines (and vice versa), these opportunities can occur during periods when the overall market is generally rising or falling.

== Risks and criticisms ==
Contrarian investing is not without its risks. The primary risk is that the market's consensus can sometimes be correct, and the asset an investor buys may continue to fall in value. It can also be psychologically challenging to go against the crowd, and an investor might face significant losses before their thesis proves correct, if it ever does. Furthermore, being right on the fundamentals but wrong on the timing can still lead to poor returns.

== Similarity to value investing ==
Contrarian investing is related to value investing in that the contrarian is also looking for mispriced investments and buying those that appear to be undervalued by the market. In "The Art of Contrary Thinking" (1954) by Humphrey B. Neill; considered influential by some in contrarian thinking, he notes it is easy to find something to go contrary to, but difficult to discover when everybody believes it. He concludes "when everybody thinks alike, everybody is likely to be wrong." Some well-known value investors such as John Neff have questioned whether there is a such thing as a "contrarian", seeing it as essentially synonymous with value investing. One possible distinction is that a value stock, in finance theory, can be identified by financial metrics such as the book value or P/E ratio. A contrarian investor may look at those metrics, but is also interested in measures of "sentiment" regarding the stock among other investors, such as sell-side analyst coverage and earnings forecasts, trading volume, and media commentary about the company and its business prospects.

In the example of a stock that has dropped because of excessive pessimism, one can see similarities to the "margin of safety" that value investor Benjamin Graham sought when purchasing stocks—essentially, being able to buy shares at a discount to their intrinsic value with an additional margin to adjust for possible errors in one's calculations. Arguably, that margin of safety is more likely to exist when a stock has fallen a great deal, and that type of drop is usually accompanied by negative news and general pessimism.

== Examples ==
Economist John Maynard Keynes was an early contrarian investor when he managed the endowment for King's College, Cambridge, from the 1920s to 1940s. While most university endowments of the time invested almost exclusively in land and fixed income assets, Keynes was perhaps the first institutional investor to invest heavily in common stocks and international stocks. On average, Keynes's investments out-performed the U.K. market by more than 6% with a strategy similar to, but developed independently of, the value investing paradigm of Benjamin Graham and Charles Dodd.

Commonly used contrarian indicators for investor sentiment are volatility indexes (informally also referred to as "fear indexes"), like VIX, which by tracking the prices of financial options gives a numeric measure of how pessimistic or optimistic market actors at large are. A low number in this index indicates a prevailing optimistic or confident investor outlook for the future, while a high number indicates a pessimistic outlook. By comparing the VIX to the major stock indexes over longer periods of time, it is thought that peaks in this index might present good buying opportunities.

Another example of a simple contrarian strategy is Dogs of the Dow. This method focuses on buying shares of the ten companies in the Dow Jones Industrial Average that have the highest relative dividend yield at the end of each calendar year and then adjusting the portfolio at the end of the next calendar year. These "Dogs" have high dividend yields not because dividends were raised, but rather because their share prices fell, and often fell sharply. With this strategy, an investor is typically buying companies perceived as distressed, unpopular, or simply at a low point in their business cycle. Finance professor Jeremy Siegel has endorsed the Dogs of the Dow method, and describes it as historically outperforming the broad Dow index of 30 stocks if consistently applied over a long period of time. Siegel also notes that a similar strategy for the S&P 500 (buying the quintile of stocks with the highest dividend yields, and systematically re-balancing once a year), has outperformed the broad S&P 500 in hypothetical back tests.

When the dot-com bubble started to deflate in early 2000 after several years of wide enthusiasm for internet stocks, an investor would have profited by avoiding the trendy technology stocks that were the subject of most investors' attention. Asset classes such as value stocks and real estate investment trusts were largely ignored by the financial press at the time, despite their historically low valuations, and many mutual funds in those categories lost assets. These investments experienced strong gains amidst the large drops in the overall US stock market when the bubble unwound: from 2000 to 2011 the S&P 500 US large-company index averaged 2.44% a year, far below its long-term average, while a REIT index averaged 13.74% per year. Sir John Templeton successfully shorted many dot-com stocks at the peak of the bubble during what he called "temporary insanity" amongst investors and a "once-in-a-lifetime opportunity". He shorted these stocks just before the expiration of lockup periods ending six months after initial public offerings, correctly anticipating many dot-com company executives would sell shares as soon as possible, and that large-scale selling would force down share prices.

The Fidelity Contrafund was founded in 1967 "to take a contrarian view, investing in out-of-favor stocks or sectors", but over time has abandoned this strategy to become a large cap growth fund.

== Relationship to behavioral finance ==
Contrarians are attempting to exploit some of the principles of behavioral finance, and there is significant overlap between these fields. For example, studies in behavioral finance have demonstrated that investors as a group tend to overweight recent trends when predicting the future; a poorly performing stock will remain bad, and a strong performer will remain strong. This lends credence to the contrarian's belief that investments may drop "too low" during periods of negative news, due to incorrect assumptions by other investors, regarding the long-term prospects for the company. Furthermore, Foye and Mramor (2016) find that country-specific factors have a strong influence on measures of value (such as the book-to-market ratio). This leads them to conclude that the reasons why value stocks outperform are both country-specific and behavioral.

== Notable contrarian investors ==
- Bill Ackman is a contrarian investor who twice reinvested heavily in beaten-down Valeant Pharmaceuticals against prevailing market sentiments. Later, he short-sold Herbalife, but was forced to take a large loss after the stock failed to fall as predicted.
- Warren Buffett is a famous contrarian, who believes the best time to invest in a stock is when shortsightedness of the market has beaten down the price.
- Dodge & Cox is an American investing firm whose approach has been characterized as contrarian.
- David Dreman is a money manager often associated with contrarian investing. He has authored several books on the topic and writes the "Contrarian" column in Forbes magazine.
- Marc Faber is a contrarian investor who publishes the Gloom Boom & Doom Report.
- Keith Gill is a deep value contrarian investor and YouTuber who championed GameStop, leading to over 10,000% gains and $44 million in 2 years from an initial $53,000 bet on the downtrodden stock.
- Allan Gray was a noted South African contrarian investor that believed the best value was typically to be had when the market was down.
- Paul Tudor Jones is a contrarian investor who attempts to buy and sell turning points.
- John Maynard Keynes was an early contrarian investor.
- Michael Lee-Chin is a Jamaican billionaire investor who is often associated with contrarian investing.
- Howard Marks regularly focuses his client memos on contrarian investing.
- John Neff, who managed the Vanguard Windsor fund for many years, is also considered a contrarian, though he has described himself as a value investor (and questioned the distinction).
- Humphrey B. Neill has been described as the father of contrary investing; see his book cited above.
- Mark Ripple is a money manager often described as a contrarian. He has authored a book covering the topic in detail.
- Jim Rogers is an investor and author who is bullish on contrarian investing in Asian markets.
- George Soros is often described as a visionary contrarian investor by analysts who cite his famous shorting of the yen and pound, an act that netted him $2 billion in profits.

== See also ==
- Bollinger Bands
- Dow Jones Indexes
- Value investing
