= Javier Estrada =

Javier Estrada may refer to:

- Javier Estrada (professor) (born 1964), Spanish-Argentinian finance professor
- Javier Estrada González (born 1967), Mexican politician
- Xavier Estrada Fernández (born 1976), Spanish football referee
- Javier Estrada, Spanish singer and La Granja VIP contestant
