= James O'Shaughnessy =

James O'Shaughnessy may refer to:

- James O'Shaughnessy (investor), American investor, the founder of O'Shaughnessy Asset Management, and the founder of O'Shaughnessy Ventures
- James O'Shaughnessy (American football), American football tight end
- James O'Shaughnessy, Baron O'Shaughnessy, British politician
