= Mark Hulbert =

American finance analyst and journalist (born 1955)

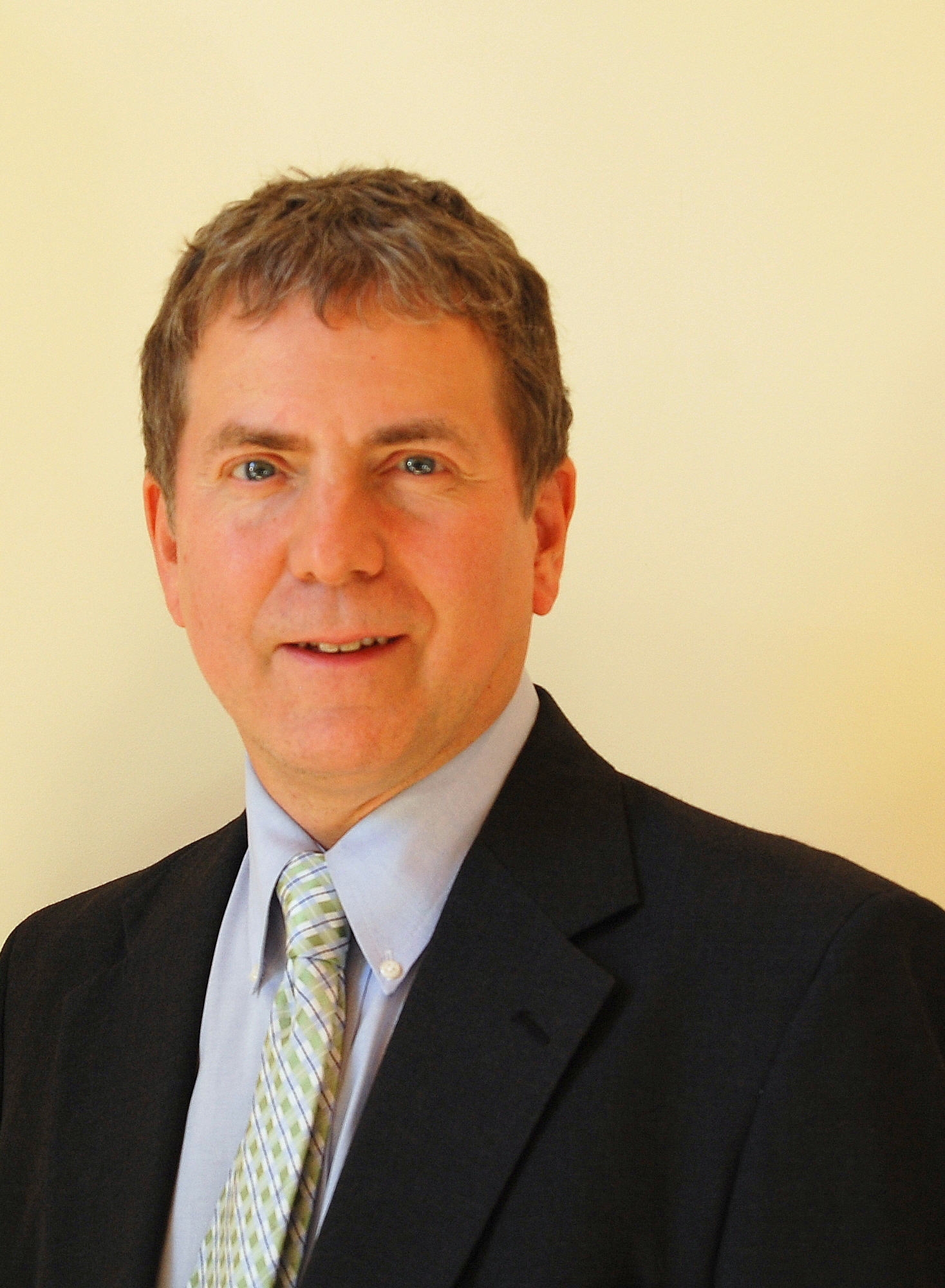
- Mark J. Hulbert in 2009
- Born: 1955 (age 70–71); Kansas
- Education: Haverford College; University of Oxford
- Occupation: Journalist for MarketWatch
- Known for: Tracking the performance of investment newsletters
- Website: hulbertratings.com

Mark J. Hulbert (born 1955) is an American finance analyst, journalist, and author with a focus on expectations of stock market investment newsletters, contrarian investing, and quantitive or technical analysis.

== Early life and education ==
Hulbert was born in Kansas in 1955. His father was a professor of botany at Kansas State University. Hulbert graduated in philosophy from Haverford College in 1977 and from the University of Oxford in 1979.

== Career ==
In September 1980, with financing from James Davidson and William Bonner, Hulbert launched Hulbert Financial Digest, a publication that tracked the performance of investment newsletters from the perspective of actual subscribers, including the timing and specificity of the buy/sell information published in such newsletters.. It grew to 14,000 subscribers by 1985.

In 1985, Hulbert won a libel suit filed by a publisher that ranked at the bottom of Hulbert's ratings.

By 1988, Hulbert was rating 125 newsletters based on specific, actionable buy/sell recommendations and risk-adjusted performance. He was based out of his townhouse on Capitol Hill. His digest received $600,000 in annual revenue and was spending $15,000-$20,000 on newsletter subscriptions.

Hulbert also calculated how much of the newsletters' performance is due to picking stocks with good prospects and how much due to market timing.

From 1998 through early 2010, Hulbert wrote a column on investment strategies published in the Sunday edition of The New York Times.

In 2000, an annual subscription to Hulbert's publication cost $135.

In April 2002, Hulbert sold the company that owned the digest and interactive website to MarketWatch. Hulbert became an editor and writer of a column on MarketWatch.

In March 2004, Hulbert launched Hulbert Interactive, a website for interactive research into investment newsletters and advisors.

In 2014, Hulbert announced that The Prudent Speculator, an investment newsletter edited by John Buckingham, had the best average annual return over the last 20 years of all newsletters, with an average annual return of 16.3%.

In February 2016, the final issue of the newsletter was published, with Hulbert noting "In today’s world ... awash as it is in Big Data, [the newsletter] seems to be less needed. That, at least, is the judgment of the market."

Hulbert continues to write columns for MarketWatch.

=== Hulbert Stock Newsletter Sentiment Index ===
The Hulbert Stock Newsletter Sentiment Index (HSNSI) "reflects the average recommended stock market exposure among a subset of short-term market timers tracked". HSNSI is a contrarian investing indicator: if it is high, he views the outlook for stocks as poor. Conversely, when it is low, his outlook is good. The predictive power of the Index has been disputed by CXO Advisory Group.

=== Hulbert comments on the value of newsletters ===
Hulbert admits that his newsletter has no value to a hypothetical emotionless investor: "Simply put, the odds are overwhelming that — over the long term — you will make more money by buying and holding an index fund." But real investors are "...unable to hold an index fund through a bear market, and by selling near the bottom they fail to realize ... [the] theoretical longterm potential." In contrast, he claims real investors are "...likely to make more money ... by following strategies that are statistically inferior ... but which are psychologically superior..." because the investor will follow their chosen advisor newsletter rigorously, which is preferable to buying an index fund but panic selling in a down market.

== Publications ==
=== Books ===
- Interlock: The Untold Story of American Banks, Oil Interests, the Shah's Money, Debts and Astounding Connections Between Them
- The Hulbert guide to financial newsletters.
- Constructive Approaches to the Foreign Debt Dilemma, a collection of papers presented at a seminar of the Taxpayers' Foundation held on September 21, 1983, in Washington DC (edited along with Eric Meltzer).

=== Noteworthy articles ===
- Opinion: Two lessons from Lehman Brothers’ 2008 collapse can save your investments August 28, 2018, MarketWatch
- Opinion: ‘Tech wreck’ is not what will end this bull market September 7, 2018, MarketWatch
- Opinion: Greedy stock investors are starting to show signs of irrational exuberance September 14, 2018, MarketWatch

== See also ==
- Fed model
