= Kenneth Fisher =

American investment adviser (born 1950)

- Born: Kenneth Lawrence Fisher; November 29, 1950 (age 75); San Francisco, California, U.S.
- Education: California State Polytechnic University, Humboldt
- Occupations: Founder and executive chairman of Fisher Investments
- Spouse: Sherrilyn Fisher
- Children: 3
- Father: Philip A. Fisher
- Website: www.fisherinvestments.com

Kenneth Lawrence Fisher (born November 29, 1950) is an American billionaire investment analyst, author, and the founder and executive chairman of Fisher Investments, a fee-only financial adviser. Fisher's Forbes "Portfolio Strategy" column ran from 1984 to 2017, making him the longest continuously running columnist in the magazine's history. Fisher is now known for writing monthly, native language columns in international outlets. Fisher has authored eleven books on investing, and research papers in the field of behavioral finance. In 2010, he was included in Investment Advisor magazine's "30 for 30" list of the 30 most influential people in the investment advisory business over the last 30 years. As of January 2026, his net worth was estimated at $13.2 billion.

== Life and work ==
Kenneth Fisher was born in San Francisco, California, the son of influential stock investor Philip A. Fisher. Fisher was raised in San Mateo, California. As a 13-year-old, he earned $1.20 an hour picking fruit, sawing and fertilizing. He dropped out of high school and went to Cal Poly Humboldt to study forestry, and graduated with an associate degree in economics in 1972. Humboldt State recognized Fisher with its Distinguished Alumni Award in 2007. In 2015, Fisher was appointed to the board of advisors of the Forbes School of Business at Ashford University.

Over the past few decades, Fisher helped Fisher Investments become one of the largest independent money managers in the world.

In 2007, Fisher and Thomas Grüner founded Grüner Fisher Investments in Germany.

Starting Fisher Investments in 1979 with just $250, Ken grew Fisher Investments to over $275 billion in assets under management by 2024. By the end of 2025, this figure had risen to over $386 billion.

== Fisher Investments ==
Fisher is founder and chairman of Fisher Investments, an independent money management firm. He founded the firm in 1979, incorporated in 1986, and was CEO until July 2016, when he was succeeded by long-time employee Damian Ornani. Fisher remains active as the firm's executive chairman and co-chief investment officer.

In June 2024, Fisher Investments announced Advent International and the Abu Dhabi Investment Authority agreed to purchase a minority stake in the company worth between $2.5 billion and $3 billion. The deal valued Fisher Investments at about $13 billion and was the first outside investment in the company. Fisher retained majority beneficial ownership and more than 70% of the voting shares following the sale, which completed in early 2025.

== Investment research and philosophy ==
Fisher's theoretical work identifying and testing the price-to-sales ratio (PSR) is detailed in his 1984 Dow Jones book, Super Stocks. James O'Shaughnessy credits Fisher with being the first to define and use the PSR as a forecasting tool. In Fisher's 2006 book, The Only Three Questions That Count, he states that the PSR is widely used and known, and no longer as useful as an indicator for undervalued stocks.

According to The Guru Investor by John P. Reese and Jack M. Forehand, in the late 1990s, Fisher defined his investment philosophy after studying the stock returns and P/E Ratios between January 1976 and June 1995 of six investment categories: large-cap value, mid-cap value, small-cap value, large-cap growth, mid-cap growth, and small-cap growth.

Small-cap value was not defined as an investing category until the late 1980s. Fisher Investments was among the institutional money managers offering small-cap value investing to clients in the late 1980s.

== Columns, books and other media ==
Fisher is well known for his investment columns, which currently run in the New York Post and 18 other countries. Fisher's Forbes 'Portfolio Strategy" column ran from 1984 to 2017. Fisher also publishes regular YouTube videos answering common investor questions and appears on major US and international broadcast media, including Bloomberg TV, CNBC, CNBC Asia, CNN International and Fox News.

Columns
Country	Publication	Language	Ref.
Argentina	Infobae	Spanish	
Australia	The Australian Financial Review	English	
Austria	Trend (magazine)	German	
Belgium	La Libre	French	
Canada	Globe and Mail	English	
China	Caixin	Chinese/English	
Denmark	Dagbladet Børsen	Danish	
France	L'Opinion (French newspaper)	French	
Germany	Focus Money	German	
Hong Kong	Hong Kong Economic Journal	Chinese	
Ireland	Irish Independent	English	
Israel	Calcalist	Hebrew	
Italy	Il Sole 24 Ore	Italian	
Japan	Diamond Weekly	Japanese	
Mexico	El Financiero	Spanish	
Netherlands	De Telegraaf	Dutch	
Portugal	Jornal de Negócios	Portuguese	
Saudi Arabia	Al Eqtisadiah	Arabic	
Singapore	The Business Times (Singapore)	English	
South Korea	The Chosun Ilbo	Korean	
Sweden	Privata Affärer	Swedish	
Spain	El Economista (Spain)	Spanish	
Switzerland	Handelszeitung	German	
Taiwan	Business Weekly	Chinese	
United Arab Emirates’	The National (Abu Dhabi)	English	
United Kingdom	The Daily Telegraph	English	
US	New York Post	English	

Fisher has authored eleven investing books, six of which were national best sellers:

- Super Stocks (1984)
- The Wall Street Waltz (1987)
- 100 Minds that Made the Market (1993)
- The Only Three Questions That Count (2006)
- The Ten Roads to Riches (2008)
- How To Smell A Rat (2009)
- Debunkery (2010)
- Markets Never Forget (2011)
- Plan Your Prosperity (2012)
- The Little Book of Market Myths (2013)
- Beat The Crowd (2015).

The Only Three Questions That Still Count, The Ten Roads to Riches, How to Smell a Rat, and Debunkery were all New York Times bestsellers.

In 2015, Fisher released Beat the Crowd: How You Can Out-Invest the Herd by Thinking Differently. In an interview with CNN Money, Fisher discusses how media hype around major economic events have already been priced into stock markets globally, and why investors are better served worrying about factors the market is ignoring. Fisher released the Second Edition of The Only Three Questions That Count in April 2012, the Second Edition of The Ten Roads to Riches in April 2017, and the Third Edition of The Only Three Questions That Count in November 2025.

== Philanthropy ==
In 2006, Fisher gave $3.5 million to endow the Kenneth L. Fisher Chair in Redwood Forest Ecology at Humboldt State. The gift supports redwood ecology research in perpetuity and provides support for graduate students, laboratories, and field equipment; the research has focused particularly on canopy studies. Fisher's goal in creating the chair was to transform our understanding of trees and forests.

In 2012, Fisher and his wife gave $7.5 million to Johns Hopkins University to fund the new Sherrilyn and Ken Fisher Center for Environmental Infectious Diseases. After much deliberation, the Fishers’ donation was approved.

== Political activity ==
Together with his spouse, Fisher contributed $250,000 to Donald Trump's 2020 presidential campaign.

In the 2024 presidential campaign cycle, FEC records show Fisher did not contribute to Trump, Joe Biden or Kamala Harris, but gave to others, including Republican and Democratic candidates, and Robert F. Kennedy Jr.

== Controversy ==
In October 2019, Fisher was criticized for references he made during a fireside chat at an industry conference sponsored by Tiburon Strategic Advisors.

Reporting on the story was led by Bloomberg. In an October 2019 article, Bloomberg, which called Fisher "among the most successful money managers in America" wrote that he made comments likening winning money-management clients to "trying to get into a girls' pants." In a Bloomberg interview at the time, Fisher said he felt his comments were taken out of context. In February 2020, Bloomberg corrected its reporting and wrote Fisher "cautioned against using financial planning—which involves getting people to talk about their money—as a way to sign up new investing clients, comparing that approach to picking up a woman in a bar." A recording made at the Tiburon conference, obtained by CNBC and referenced by Bloomberg, captures Fisher saying "you wouldn't go up to a woman in a bar and ask what's in your pants."

On October 11, 2019, it was announced that in response to Fisher's comments, the state of Michigan withdrew its pension fund of $600 million from Fisher Investments. On October 16, 2019, the city of Boston pulled their $248 million pension fund from Fisher Investments due to Fisher's off-color comments.

Other repercussions followed. Fidelity announced it was reviewing the $500 million in assets that it has Fisher's organization manage, and Philadelphia's board of pensions terminated its relationship with Fisher. Within weeks of the incident Fisher Investments lost more than $2.7 billion as several institutional clients, including government pensions, severed their relationship with the firm. The firm Fisher founded is taking action as well. Fisher Investments Chief Executive Damian Ornani wrote a memo to employees stating: “Ken's comments were wrong.” He said the firm was taking steps to address diversity and inclusion within the organization itself. A report from Bloomberg L.P. contended that this behavior was commonplace at Fisher Investments and that Fisher himself had made derogatory remarks a number of times before.

The controversy did little to slow Fisher's AUM growth. At the time of the controversy, Fisher Investments managed $100 billion in assets. By December 2019, Fisher's assets under management rose to $121 billion. By February 2025, the firm nearly tripled in size to $299 billion in assets under management.

== Personal life ==
Fisher is married, with three adult sons, Nathan, Jesse and Clayton. He lives in Dallas, Texas. Nathan Fisher is the CEO of Fisher\SMB, which was formerly part of Fisher Investments and known as Fisher 401k Solutions, but now operates as an independent entity.
