= Magic formula =

Magic formula may refer to:

- Magical formula, a word that is believed to have specific supernatural effects
- Magic formula investing, an investment technique outlined by Joel Greenblatt that uses the principles of value investing
- Magic formula (Swiss politics), an arithmetic formula for dividing the seven executive seats on the Federal Council among the four coalition parties in Swiss politics
