= Altman Z-score =

Model for assessing likelihood of bankruptcy

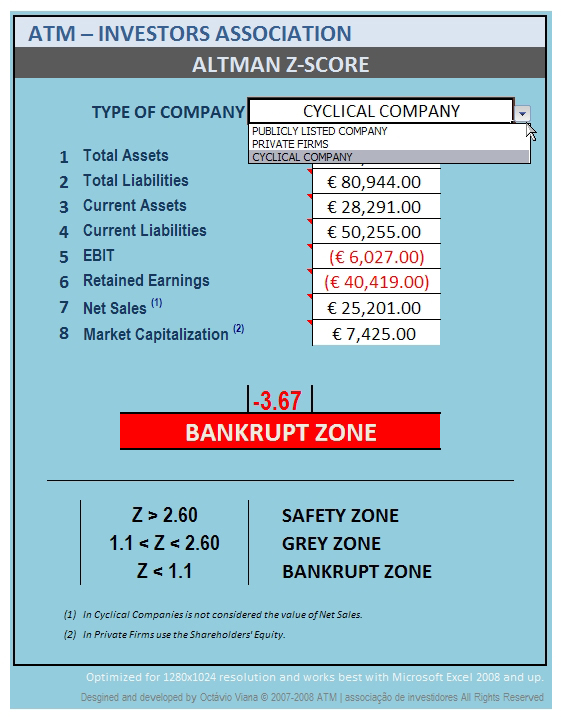
Example of an Excel spreadsheet that uses Altman Z-score to predict the probability that a firm will go into bankruptcy within two years

The Z-score formula for predicting bankruptcy was published in 1968 by Edward I. Altman, who was, at the time, an Assistant Professor of Finance at New York University. The formula may be used to determine the probability that a firm will go into bankruptcy within two years. Z-scores are used to predict corporate defaults and an easy-to-calculate control measure for the financial distress status of companies in academic studies. The Z-score uses multiple corporate income and balance sheet values to measure the financial health of a company.

== The formula ==
The Z-score is a linear combination of four or five common business ratios, weighted by coefficients. The coefficients were estimated by identifying a set of firms which had declared bankruptcy and then collecting a matched sample of firms which had survived, with matching by industry and approximate size (assets).

Altman applied the statistical method of discriminant analysis to a dataset of publicly held manufacturers. The estimation was originally based on data from publicly held manufacturers, but has since been re-estimated based on other datasets for private manufacturing, non-manufacturing and service companies.

The original data sample consisted of 66 firms, half of which had filed for bankruptcy under Chapter 7. All businesses in the database were manufacturers, and small firms with assets of < $1 million were eliminated.

The original Z-score formula was as follows:

Z = 1.2X_{1} + 1.4X_{2} + 3.3X_{3} + 0.6X_{4} + 1.0X_{5}.

X_{1} = ratio of working capital to total assets. Measures liquid assets in relation to the size of the company.

X_{2} = ratio of retained earnings to total assets. Measures profitability that reflects the company's age and earning power.

X_{3} = ratio of earnings before interest and taxes to total assets. Measures operating efficiency apart from tax and leveraging factors. It recognizes operating earnings as being important to long-term viability.

X_{4} = ratio of market value of equity to book value of total liabilities. Adds market dimension that can show up security price fluctuation as a possible red flag.

X_{5} = ratio of sales to total assets. Standard measure for total asset turnover (varies greatly from industry to industry).

Altman found that the ratio profile for the bankrupt group fell at −0.25 avg, and for the non-bankrupt group at +4.48 avg.

== Precedents ==
Altman's work built upon research by accounting researcher William Beaver and others. In the 1930s and on, Mervyn and others had collected matched samples and assessed that various accounting ratios appeared to be valuable in predicting bankruptcy. Altman Z-score is a customized version of the discriminant analysis technique of R. A. Fisher (1936).

William Beaver's work, published in 1966 and 1968, was the first to apply a statistical method, t-tests to predict bankruptcy for a pair-matched sample of firms. Beaver applied this method to evaluate the importance of each of several accounting ratios based on univariate analysis, using each accounting ratio one at a time. Altman's primary improvement was to apply a statistical method, discriminant analysis, which could take into account multiple variables simultaneously.

== Accuracy and effectiveness ==
In its initial test, the Altman Z-score was found to be 72% accurate in predicting bankruptcy two years before the event, with a Type II error (false negatives) of 6% (Altman, 1968). In a series of subsequent tests covering three periods over the next 31 years (up until 1999), the model was found to be approximately 80–90% accurate in predicting bankruptcy one year before the event, with a Type II error (classifying the firm as bankrupt when it does not go bankrupt) of approximately 15–20% (Altman, 2000).

This overstates the predictive ability of the Altman Z-score, however. Scholars have long criticized the Altman Z-score for being “largely descriptive statements devoid of predictive content ... Altman demonstrates that failed and non-failed firms have dissimilar ratios, not that ratios have predictive power. But the crucial problem is to make an inference in the reverse direction, i.e., from ratios to failures.” From about 1985 onwards, the Z-scores gained wide acceptance by auditors, management accountants, courts, and database systems used for loan evaluation (Eidleman). The formula's approach has been used in a variety of contexts and countries, although it was designed originally for publicly held manufacturing companies with assets of more than $1 million. Later variations by Altman were designed to be applicable to privately held companies (the Altman Z'-score) and non-manufacturing companies (the Altman Z"-score).

Neither the Altman models nor other balance sheet-based models are recommended for use with financial companies. This is because of the opacity of financial companies' balance sheets and their frequent use of off-balance sheet items.

Modern academic default and bankruptcy prediction models rely heavily on market-based data rather than the accounting ratios predominant in the Altman Z-score.

== Original Z-score component definitions ==
X_{1} = working capital / total assets
X_{2} = retained earnings / total assets
X_{3} = earnings before interest and taxes / total assets
X_{4} = market value of equity / total liabilities
X_{5} = sales / total assets

Z-score bankruptcy model:

Z = 1.2X_{1} + 1.4X_{2} + 3.3X_{3} + 0.6X_{4} + 1X_{5}

Zones of discrimination:

Z > 2.99 – "safe" zone
1.81 < Z < 2.99 – "grey" zone
Z < 1.81 – "distress" zone

== Z-score estimated for non-manufacturers and emerging markets ==
X_{1} = (current assets − current liabilities) / total assets
X_{2} = retained earnings / total assets
X_{3} = earnings before interest and taxes / total assets
X_{4} = book value of equity / total liabilities

Z-score bankruptcy model (non-manufacturers):

Z = 6.56X_{1} + 3.26X_{2} + 6.72X_{3} + 1.05X_{4}

Z-score bankruptcy model (emerging markets):

Z = 3.25 + 6.56X_{1} + 3.26X_{2} + 6.72X_{3} + 1.05X_{4}

Zones of discrimination:

Z > 2.6 – "safe" zone
1.1 < Z < 2.6 – "grey" zone
Z < 1.1 – "distress" zone

== Examples ==
Altman's Z-score for International Credit Rating Agencies
Defaulter	Amount of Liabilities	Date of Default	Z-Score					Rating at the time of default			The Consequences
	(in $ billion)		In year of default	1 year prior	2 years prior	3 years prior	4 years prior	S&P	Moody's	Fitch	
Bear Stearns	387	31-July-2007	0.29	−0.79	0.45	0.4	0.36	AA a A	A1 a A2		Acquired by JP Morgan Chase
AIG	807	16-Sep-2008	−1.03	−0.07	−0.02	0.42	0.23	AA− a A−	A1 a A2	AA− a A−	Bailed out by US Government
Lehman Brothers	392	23-Sep-2008	0.06	0.09	0.03	-0.03	0.29	AA, A1	P1 & A1	AA− & F1+	Bankrupt
Washington Mutual Bank	303	25-Sep-2008	−0.35	−0.3	−0.07	−0.13	-0.3	A− & A2	Baa1 & P2	A− & F2	Acquired by JP Morgan Chase
Ford Motors	132	6-Apr-2009	1.32	1.03	1.23	1	1.29	CC	Caa1, B3	CCC, BB	Revived
MF Global	51	31-Oct-2011	0.23	0.47	0.37	0.41	0.46		Baa2 a Caa	BBB a BB+	Bankrupt

Altman's Z-scores of largest Indian Defaulters during April 2005 to March 2013
Defaulter	Amount of Liabilities (in Rs cr)	Date of default	Z-Score					Rating at the time of default	The Consequences
	in Crore		In the Year of default	1 yr prior to default	2 yr prior to default	3 yr prior to default	4 yr prior to default		
Arvind Products	251.8	10-Feb-2009	1.58	1.93	2.14	1.61	1.73	CRSIL BBB	Restructured
Ansal Properties & Infrastructure	1359	5-Oct-2009	2.3	3.21	4.22	4.85	3.06	Fitch BBB	Restructured
Kingfisher Airlines Limited	4105.88	1-Dec-2011	−2.36	1.85	0.61	0.79	1.93	CRISIL D	Non Operational
Royal Orchid Hotel Limited	220	31-Mar-2012	0.77	1.06	1.17	1.62	2.17	ICRA BBB+	Restructured
Deccan Chronicle Holdings	3902	2-Jul-2012	−0.12	2.74	3.01	2.54	2.77	Care A1	Assets sold by banks
Suzlon Energy Limited	10948	17-Jun-2012	−0.11	1.23	1.28	1.19	1.24	ICRA BBB− a D	Restructured

== See also ==
- Standard score
- Z-test
- Z-factor
- Ohlson O-score
- Beneish M-score
- Piotroski F-score
