= Fisher Investments =

American independent money management firm

- Type: Private
- Industry: Financial services
- Founded: 1979; 47 years ago
- Founder: Ken Fisher
- Headquarters: Plano, Texas, U.S.
- Number of locations: 29 offices (2023)
- Area served: United States, Canada, Europe, Middle East, Asia, Australasia
- Key people: Damian Ornani (CEO); Steven Triplett (COO)
- Services: Asset management
- AUM: $441+ billion (June 2026)
- Number of employees: +6,000 (2025)
- Subsidiaries: Fisher Investments Europe, Grüner Fisher Investments GmbH
- Website: fisherinvestments.com

Fisher Investments is an American independent money management firm headquartered in Plano, Texas.

== History ==
Ken Fisher founded the firm in 1979, then served as CEO until July 2016, when he was succeeded by long-time Fisher Investments employee Damian Ornani. Fisher remains active as the firm's executive chairman and co-chief investment officer.

As of June 2026, Fisher Investments and its subsidiaries manage over $441 billion in assets for individual and institutional investors globally. The firm maintains three principal business units: Fisher Investments Institutional Group, Fisher Investments Private Client Group, and Fisher Investments Private Client Group International. In June 2024, the firm announced its 401(k) Solutions business for small to mid-sized retirement plans would be spun off into an independent company called Fisher Retirement Solutions.

The firm incorporated Fisher Investments Europe Limited in 1999 with its headquarters in London. Later it expanded the firm's US operations by opening offices in Vancouver, Washington; Plano, Texas; and Tampa, Florida. The firm also entered into a joint venture in Germany to offer investment services as Grüner Fisher Investments GmbH, which is now a wholly owned subsidiary of Fisher Investments.

In late 2011, Fisher Investments opened a new headquarters on the 120-acre Fisher Creek campus in Camas, Washington. Over the next three years, Fisher Investments expanded its local presence by constructing two additional buildings on the Fisher Creek campus. In 2020, the company opened a fourth building on the campus. The five-story building has room for an additional 1,100 employees.

Fisher Investments has also opened international offices in eight countries.

The firm announced its intention to move its headquarters to Texas in March 2023. The firm intends to complete the move by June 2023. The company has stated they will maintain offices in Camas, Washington; however staffing will be prioritized in other locations.

In January 2025, Advent International and ADIA completed a minority investment of $3 billion in Fisher Investments. The deal valued Fisher Investments at $12.75 billion. On completion of the deal, Ken Fisher retained more than 70% of voting shares and continued in his role as Executive Chairman and Co-Chief Investment Officer.
