= Ohlson O-score =

Multi-factor financial formula for predicting bankruptcy

The Ohlson O-score for predicting bankruptcy is a multi-factor financial formula postulated in 1980 by Dr. James Ohlson of the New York University Stern Accounting Department as an alternative to the Altman Z-score for predicting financial distress.

== Calculation ==
The Ohlson O-Score is the result of a 9-factor linear combination of coefficient-weighted business ratios which are readily obtained or derived from the standard periodic financial disclosure statements provided by publicly traded corporations. Two of the factors utilized are widely considered to be dummies as their value and thus their impact upon the formula typically is 0. When using an O-score to evaluate the probability of company's failure, then exp(O-score) is divided by 1 + exp(O-score).

The calculation for Ohlson O-score appears below:

$$\begin{align}
T = {} & -1.32 - 0.407\log(TA_t/GNP) + 6.03\frac{TL_t}{TA_t} - 1.43\frac{WC_t}{TA_t} + 0.0757\frac{CL_t}{CA_t} \\[10pt]
& {} - 1.72 X - 2.37\frac{NI_t}{TA_t} - 1.83\frac{FFO_t}{TL_t} + 0.285Y - 0.521\frac{NI_t-NI_{t-1}}{|NI_t| + |NI_{t-1}|}
\end{align}$$

where

- TA = total assets
- GNP = gross national product price index level (in USD, 1968 = 100)
- TL = total liabilities
- WC = working capital
- CL = current liabilities
- CA = current assets
- X = 1 if TL > TA, 0 otherwise
- NI = net income
- FFO = funds from operations
- Y = 1 if a net loss for the last two years, 0 otherwise

== Interpretation ==
The original model for the O-score was derived from the study of a pool of just over 2000 companies, whereas by comparison its predecessor the Altman Z-score considered just 66 companies. As a result, the O-score is significantly more accurate a predictor of bankruptcy within a 2-year period. The original Z-score was estimated to be over 70% accurate with its later variants reaching as high as 90% accuracy. The O-score is more accurate than this.

However, no mathematical model is 100% accurate, so while the O-score may forecast bankruptcy or solvency, factors both inside and outside of the formula can impact its accuracy. Furthermore, later bankruptcy prediction models such as the hazard based model proposed by Campbell, Hilscher, and Szilagyi in 2011 have proven more accurate still. For the O-score, any results larger than 0.5 suggest that the firm will default within two years.

== See also ==
- Altman Z-score
- Beneish M-score
- Piotroski F-score
