= Martin Zweig =

American investor (1942-2013)

- Zweig in 1986
- Born: Martin Edward Zweig; July 2, 1942; Cleveland, Ohio, U.S.
- Died: February 18, 2013 (aged 70); Fisher Island, Florida, U.S.
- Education: Wharton School at the University of Pennsylvania (BSE, 1964); University of Miami (MBA, 1967); Michigan State University (Ph.D., Finance, 1969)
- Occupations: Financial analyst and investment advisor

Martin Edward Zweig (July 2, 1942 – February 18, 2013) was an American stock investor, investment adviser, and financial analyst.

According to Forbes magazine, he was renowned for his "eccentric and lavish lifestyle" and his residence atop The Pierre on Fifth avenue in Manhattan, which was the most expensive residence in the United States. It was listed on the New York City real estate market in 2004 for $70 million and in March 2013 for $125 million. His particular investing methodology was based on selecting growth stocks that also have certain value characteristics, through a system that uses both fundamental analysis and market timing. He died in 2013 at the age of 70.

== Early life and education ==
Zweig was born on July 2, 1942, in Cleveland, Ohio. He began buying stocks as a teenager, reputedly purchasing his first stock at age 13 and from that point on vowing to become a millionaire.

Following high school, he earned degrees from three business schools, including a BSE from the Wharton School at the University of Pennsylvania in 1964, an MBA degree from the University of Miami School of Business in 1967, and a Ph.D. in finance from Michigan State University in 1969. He later taught finance at Iona College and Baruch College.

== Career ==
=== Winning on Wall Street ===
Zweig began his career in the 1970s as an investment newsletter writer and contributed numerous articles to Barron's. He went on to become a successful and influential investment adviser on Wall Street, known for his exhaustive data studies. In 1986, Zweig authored the book Winning on Wall Street. In it, he called Jesse Livermore one of his heroes and "one of the most fabulous traders of all time," recommending that people read the 1923 Edwin Lefèvre book Reminiscences of a Stock Operator.

=== Mutual fund manager ===
Zweig appeared regularly on PBS television's Wall Street Week with Louis Rukeyser, and in 1992 he was voted into the program's Hall of Fame. It was on that very program that he stated on 16 October 1987, that he was deeply worried and did not like what he saw in the stock market. The 1987 stock market crash occurred on 19 October 1987. At the time of his death Zweig was the chairman of Zweig-DiMenna Associates, Inc. He is also featured in John Reese's recent book, The Guru Investor: How to Beat the Market Using History's Best Investment Strategies.

== Personal life ==
Although no cause of death was given in his obituary, Zweig had been treated for cancer, and underwent a liver transplant in 2010 with tissue from his younger son.

== Bibliography ==
- Zweig, Martin (1986). Martin Zweig's Winning on Wall Street. Warner Books. ISBN 978-0446672818.
- Zweig, Martin (1987). Martin Zweig's Winning With New IRAs. Warner Books. ISBN 978-0446512763.
