= Earnings =

Financial term

Earnings are the net benefits of a corporation's operation. Earnings are also the amount on which corporate tax is due. For an analysis of specific aspects of corporate operations several more specific terms are used as EBIT (earnings before interest and taxes) and EBITDA (earnings before interest, taxes, depreciation, and amortization).

Many alternative terms for earnings are commonly used, such as income and profit. These terms in turn have a variety of definitions, depending on their context and the objectives of the authors. For instance, the IRS uses the term profit to describe earnings, whereas for the corporation the profit it reports is the amount left after taxes are taken out.

== Non-routine earnings ==
The use of intellectual property generates non-routine profits. Those are often an order-of-magnitude greater than routine earnings. Non-routine profits are essential to warrant the high investments needed for high-technology industries.

== Earnings manipulation ==
Some statistical models (e.g. based on Benford's law or Beneish M-score) are used in order to detect possible earnings manipulations (fraud).
