= Beneish M-score =

Statistical model

The Beneish model is a statistical model that uses financial ratios calculated with accounting data of a specific company in order to check if it is likely (high probability) that the reported earnings of the company have been manipulated.

== Calculation ==
The Beneish M-score is calculated using 8 variables (financial ratios):

- Days Sales in Receivables Index (DSRI)

DSRI = (Net Receivables_{t} / Sales_{t}) / (Net Receivables_{t-1} / Sales_{t-1})

- Gross Margin Index (GMI)

GMI = [(Sales_{t-1} - COGS_{t-1}) / Sales_{t-1}] / [(Sales_{t} - COGS_{t}) / Sales_{t}]

- Asset Quality Index (AQI)

AQI = [1 - (Current Assets_{t} + PP&E_{t} + Securities_{t}) / Total Assets_{t}] / [1 - ((Current Assets_{t-1} + PP&E_{t-1} + Securities_{t-1}) / Total Assets_{t-1})]

- Sales Growth Index (SGI)

SGI = Sales_{t} / Sales_{t-1}

- Depreciation Index (DEPI)

DEPI = (Depreciation_{t-1}/ (PP&E_{t-1} + Depreciation_{t-1})) / (Depreciation_{t} / (PP&E_{t} + Depreciation_{t}))

- Sales General and Administrative Expenses Index (SGAI)

SGAI = (SG&A Expense_{t} / Sales_{t}) / (SG&A Expense_{t-1} / Sales_{t-1})

- Leverage Index (LVGI)

LVGI = [(Current Liabilities_{t} + Total Long Term Debt_{t}) / Total Assets_{t}] / [(Current Liabilities_{t-1} + Total Long Term Debt_{t-1}) / Total Assets_{t-1}]

- Total Accruals to Total Assets (TATA)

TATA = (Income from Continuing Operations_{t} - Cash Flows from Operations_{t}) / Total Assets_{t}

The formula to calculate the M-score is:

M-score = −4.84 + 0.92 × DSRI + 0.528 × GMI + 0.404 × AQI + 0.892 × SGI + 0.115 × DEPI −0.172 × SGAI + 4.679 × TATA − 0.327 × LVGI

== Interpretation ==
The threshold value is -1.78 for the model whose coefficients are reported above. (see Beneish 1999, Beneish, Lee, and Nichols 2013, and Beneish and Vorst 2020).

- If M-score is less than -1.78, the company is unlikely to be a manipulator. For example, an M-score value of -2.50 suggests a low likelihood of manipulation.
- If M-score is greater than −1.780, the company is likely to be a manipulator. For example, an M-score value of -1.50 suggests a high likelihood of manipulation.

=== Aggregate recession predictor ===
A 2023 research paper uses an aggregate score of many companies to predict recessions. It finds that the score in early 2023 is the highest in some 40 years.

== Criticism ==
The Beneish M-score is a probabilistic model, so it cannot detect companies that manipulate their earnings with 100% accuracy.

Financial institutions were excluded from the sample in Beneish paper when calculating M-score, since these institutions make money through different routes. Sales and receivables, which are two main inputs into the Beneish formula, are not used when analyzing a financial institution.

== Notable applications ==
Enron Corporation was correctly identified 1998 as an earnings manipulator by students from Cornell University using M-score. Noticeably, Wall Street financial analysts were still recommending to buy Enron shares at that point in time.

== See also ==
- Data analysis techniques for fraud detection
- Benford's law
- Piotroski F-score
- Ohlson O-score
- Altman Z-score
