= Thomson Financial =

Former business division of Thomson

- Type: Division
- Founded: 1980; 46 years ago
- Defunct: April 2008; 18 years ago
- Fate: Merger with Reuters Group plc
- Successor: Thomson Reuters
- Parent: Thomson Corporation

Thomson Financial was an arm of the Thomson Corporation, an information provider. When the Thomson Corporation merged with Reuters to form Thomson Reuters in April 2008, Thomson Financial was merged with the business of Reuters to form the Markets Division of Thomson Reuters.

== History ==
Thomson acquired magazine publisher Faulkner & Gray in 1992. Thomson Financial expanded significantly when it acquired Primark, another financial information provider, on June 6, 2000, for $842 million in an all-cash deal. Primark owned many brands in both the U.S. and UK/Europe such as Datastream, Baseline Financial, Intellivate Capital Ventures (ICV), and IBES. The acquisition consolidated and combined competing financial information provision, for example the FirstCall and IBES earnings estimate data, under the same company.

Thomson Financial sold its Thomson Media division in 2004.

On 17 April 2008, the Thomson Corporation merged with Reuters and created the new company Thomson Reuters. Thomson Financial and Reuters combined their businesses into the Markets Division: Sales & Trading, Enterprise, Investment & Advisory, and Media. The other Thomson operations were combined into the Professional Division: Legal, Healthcare & Science, and Tax & Accounting. Thomson Reuters sold the division in 2018 to Blackstone. Thomson Reuters Financial & Risk eventually became Refinitiv.

In August 2019, London Stock Exchange Group agreed to buy Refinitiv in an all-share transaction valuing the target at $27 billion.

== Major office locations ==
Thomson Financial had many offices across the US, Europe, and Asia Pacific regions. The head office was based in Boston (1987-2008) and New York (joint with Boston), with significant presence in San Francisco, London, Frankfurt, Bangalore, Manila, and many satellite offices in locations such as Sydney, Hong Kong, Tokyo, Zurich, Geneva, just as some examples. The two major data centers, not including smaller points of presence, for Thomson Financial were located in NYC and New Jersey.

In June 2007, Thomson Financial agreed to buy seven Asia-Pacific news bureaus from Xinhua Finance. The bureaus purchased were in Tokyo, Manila, Jakarta, Kuala Lumpur, Singapore, Sydney and Seoul. Xinhua Finance stated they would retain their operations in Beijing, Shanghai, Hong Kong and Taipei. Financial terms were not disclosed.

== Products ==
The company had a wide variety of financial products. Thomson ONE is a core product, although legacy branded offerings such as Datastream Advance and Global Topic will probably remain for a few years. Thomson ONE was a competitor of Bloomberg L.P., Capital IQ and FactSet Research Systems. There were different packages of Thomson ONE, i.e., Thomson ONE for Investment Management, Thomson ONE for Investment Banking, etc. Due to the acquisition of Primark and buyout of ILX Systems, Thomson Financial had seen growth over the previous four years and had seen improvement in the core product Thomson ONE.

Thomson Financial electronic transaction processing systems included Thomson AutEx trade order indications and executions, Thomson PORTIA automated portfolio management system, Thomson TradeWeb on-line trading network for fixed-income securities, and Thomson BETA Systems for securities data and brokerage processing systems.

== See also ==
- Thomson Financial League Tables
- Institutional Brokers' Estimate System
