= Bond vigilante =

Investor who protests economic policies by selling bonds

A bond vigilante is a bond market investor who protests against monetary or fiscal policies considered inflationary by selling bonds, thus increasing yields. The term was coined by Ed Yardeni in the 1980s.

In the bond market, prices move inversely to yields. When investors perceive that inflation risk or credit risk is rising they demand higher yields to compensate for the added risk. As a result, bond prices fall and yields rise, which increases the net cost of borrowing. The term refers to the (alleged) ability of the bond market to serve as a restraint on the government's ability to over-spend and over-borrow.

It has been argued that bond vigilantism is more of an uncoordinated reaction to an economic policy rather than an intentional strategy followed by protesting bond holders.

== United States ==
=== Clinton administration ===
From October 1993 to November 1994 US 10-year yields climbed from 5.2% to just over 8.0% fueled by concerns about federal spending in what became informally known as the "Great Bond Massacre." With some guidance from Robert Rubin, the United States Secretary of the Treasury, the Clinton administration and the first Republican-led Congress in 40 years (under Speaker Newt Gingrich) made an effort to reduce the deficit, and 10-year yields dropped to approximately 4% by November 1998.

Clinton political adviser James Carville said at the time, "I used to think that if there was reincarnation, I wanted to come back as the president or the pope or as a .400 baseball hitter. But now I would like to come back as the bond market. You can intimidate everybody."

=== Obama administration ===
During the Obama administration some suggested that bond vigilantes were making a return with worries over sustainability and budgetary responsibility. Mark MacQueen, a partner and money manager at Sage Advisory Services Ltd., based in Austin, Texas, said, "The vigilante group is different this time around. Its major foreign creditors. This whole idea that we need to spend our way out of our problems is being questioned." However, economist Paul Krugman and other New Keynesians pointed out that there was no evidence for bond vigilante activity by pointing out the fact that 10-year yields remained quite low.

=== Second Trump administration ===
During the second presidency of Donald Trump, the president signed an executive order on April 2 2025—the so called Liberation Day—imposing a minimum 10% tariff on all U.S. imports effective April 5. Higher tariffs on imports from 57 countries, ranging from 11% to 50%, were scheduled to take effect on April 9.

However, during the afternoon of April 9, Trump announced on Truth Social that reciprocal tariffs above 10%, which had gone into effect that morning, would be paused for 90 days for all countries except China.

Many financial commentators have asserted that the pause on tariffs was ultimately driven by significant turmoil in the U.S. bond markets. The sharp sell-off in U.S. Treasury bonds on April 9 led to a spike in yields, signaling investor concerns over the administration's aggressive trade policies and their potential to exacerbate inflation and increase government borrowing costs.

The Financial Times wrote "An apology to the bond vigilantes" as a humorous opinion piece. In there the 2025 tariffs and bond situation was presented as an example of bond vigilantism, in contrast to previous instances within the Financial Times where it was doubted whether the bond market was a driving force to explain economic policies.

== United Kingdom ==
Bond vigilantes have been described as partly responsible for the British government headed by Liz Truss's U-turn on its proposed mini-budget, which would have greatly increased disposable income by cutting taxes across the board. As a result of the proposed plan, the British pound fell to its all time low against the dollar and government bond yields rose to multi-year highs, forcing the Bank of England to intervene and causing Liz Truss to sack then Chancellor of the Exchequer Kwasi Kwarteng. After new Chancellor of the Exchequer Jeremy Hunt announced the plan would be scrapped on 17 October, bond markets began to stabilize.

== Eurozone ==
During the eurozone crisis that started in 2009, bond vigilantes were blamed for pushing up the government borrowing in the periphery countries. However, many economists agree with Ed Yardeni that actions of central banks are able to keep rates low against the pressure of bond vigilantes.
