= The Only Three Questions That Count =

The Only Three Questions That Count: Investing by Knowing What Others Don't
- Author: Ken Fisher with Jennifer Chou and Lara Hoffmans
- Language: English
- Genre: Finance
- Publisher: John Wiley & Sons
- Publication date: 2007
- Pages: 448
- ISBN: 0-470-07499-X
- OCLC: 76836205
- Dewey Decimal: 332.6 22
- LC Class: HG4521 .F585 2007

The Only Three Questions that Count: Investing by Knowing What Others Don't is a book on investment advice by Ken Fisher. It was released in December 2006 and spent three months on The New York Times list of "Hardcover business bestsellers" . It was also a Wall Street Journal and a BusinessWeek best seller.

== Overview ==
In the book, Fisher says that because the stock market is a discounter of all widely known information, the only way to make, on average, winning market bets is knowing something most others don't. The book claims investing should be treated as a science, not a craft, and details a methodology for testing beliefs and uncovering information not widely known or understood. The book's scientific method consists of asking three questions:

1. What do I believe that's wrong?
2. What can I fathom that others can't?
3. What is my brain doing to mislead me?

The first question addresses common investing errors, the second shows how to try to find bettable patterns which others may misinterpret, and the third deals with behavioral finance, pointing out cognitive errors such as overconfidence and confirmation bias.

Other issues covered include high P/E ratios; debt; the federal budget, trade, and current account deficits; the U.S. dollar; high oil prices; emerging markets; gold; and the U.S. economy.

== Reception ==
Book reviews have appeared in the Financial Times, which stated "you get the impression that its author, Ken Fisher, does not often find himself short of things to say. The stream of consciousness that flows through the book can be distracting but it is impressive and certainly never dull." Forbes Magazine which said "Fisher's key insight is that investment is not a craft that can be mastered by merely accumulating information." and Canada's National Post which says that the book " dispels more than a dozen ... myths".
