= Data analysis for fraud detection =

Data analysis techniques for fraud detection

Fraud represents a significant problem for governments and businesses and specialized analysis techniques for discovering fraud using them are required. Some of these methods include knowledge discovery in databases (KDD), data mining, machine learning and statistics. They offer applicable and successful solutions in different areas of electronic fraud crimes.

In general, the primary reason to use data analytics techniques is to tackle fraud since many internal control systems have serious weaknesses. In order to effectively test, detect, validate, correct error and monitor control systems against fraudulent activities, businesses entities and organizations rely on specialized data analytics techniques such as data mining, data matching, the sounds like function, regression analysis, clustering analysis, and gap analysis. Techniques used for fraud detection fall into two primary classes: statistical techniques and artificial intelligence.

== Statistical techniques ==
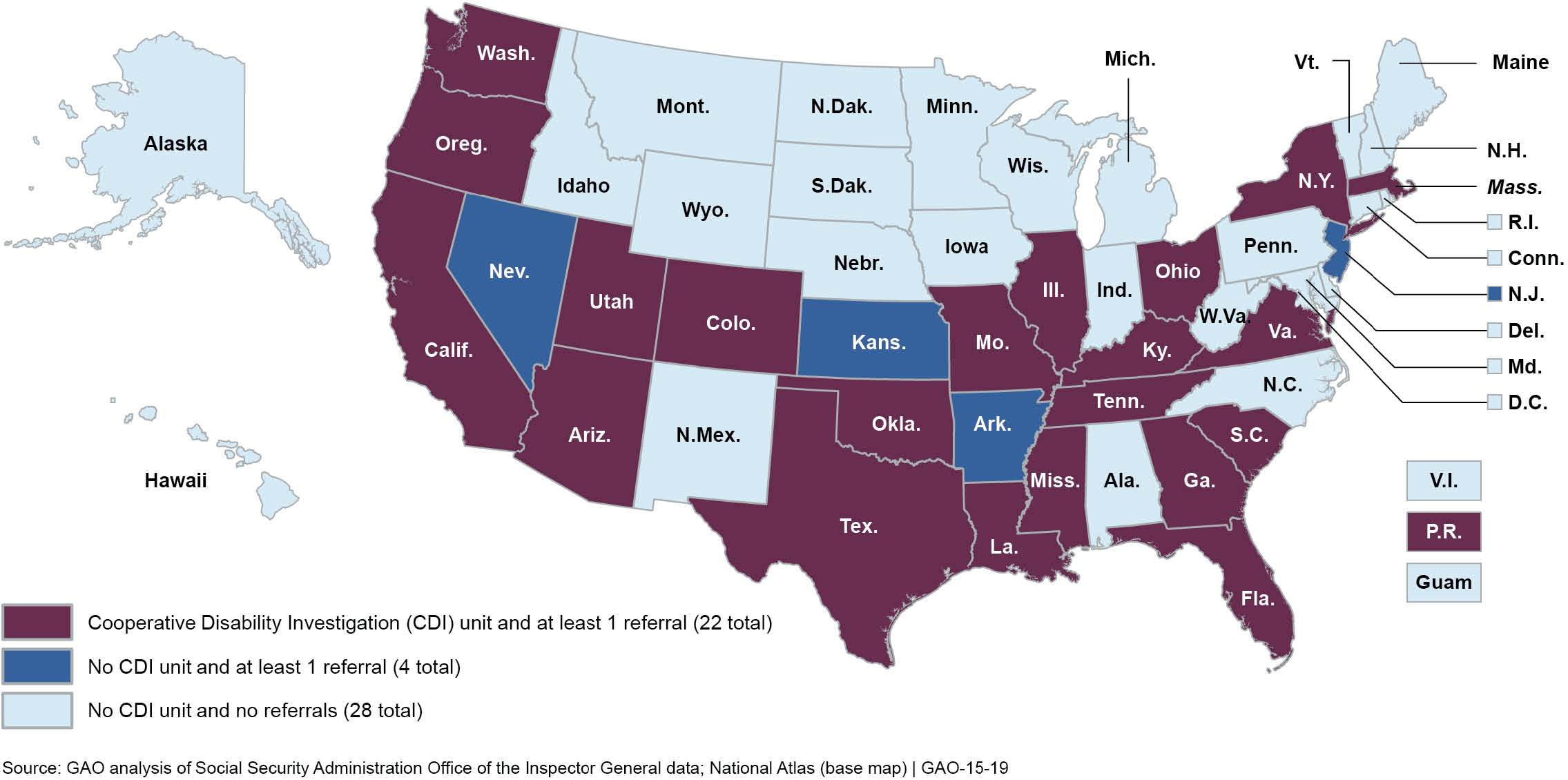
A map of disability fraud allegations in the United States by state

Examples of statistical data analysis techniques are:

- Data preprocessing techniques for detection, validation, error correction, and filling up of missing or incorrect data.
- Calculation of various statistical parameters such as averages, quantiles, performance metrics, probability distributions, and so on. For example, the averages may include average length of call, average number of calls per month and average delays in bill payment.
- Models and probability distributions of various business activities either in terms of various parameters or probability distributions.
- Computing user profiles.
- Time-series analysis of time-dependent data.
- Clustering and classification to find patterns and associations among groups of data.
- Data matching Data matching is used to compare two sets of collected data. The process can be performed based on algorithms or programmed loops. Trying to match sets of data against each other or comparing complex data types. Data matching is used to remove duplicate records and identify links between two data sets for marketing, security or other uses.
- Sounds like Function is used to find values that sound similar. The Phonetic similarity is one way to locate possible duplicate values, or inconsistent spelling in manually entered data. The ‘sounds like’ function converts the comparison strings to four-character American Soundex codes, which are based on the first letter, and the first three consonants after the first letter, in each string.
- Regression analysis allows you to examine the relationship between two or more variables of interest. Regression analysis estimates relationships between independent variables and a dependent variable. This method can be used to help understand and identify relationships among variables and predict actual results.
- Gap analysis is used to determine whether business requirements are being met, if not, what are the steps that should be taken to meet successfully.
- Matching algorithms to detect anomalies in the behavior of transactions or users as compared to previously known models and profiles. Techniques are also needed to eliminate false alarms, estimate risks, and predict future of current transactions or users.

Some forensic accountants specialize in forensic analytics which is the procurement and analysis of electronic data to reconstruct, detect, or otherwise support a claim of financial fraud. The main steps in forensic analytics are data collection, data preparation, data analysis, and reporting. For example, forensic analytics may be used to review an employee's purchasing card activity to assess whether any of the purchases were diverted or divertible for personal use.

== Artificial intelligence ==
Fraud detection is a knowledge-intensive activity. The main AI techniques used for fraud detection include:

- Data mining to classify, cluster, and segment the data and automatically find associations and rules in the data that may signify interesting patterns, including those related to fraud.
- Expert systems to encode expertise for detecting fraud in the form of rules.
- Pattern recognition to detect approximate classes, clusters, or patterns of suspicious behavior either automatically (unsupervised) or to match given inputs.
- Machine learning techniques to automatically identify characteristics of fraud.
- Neural nets to independently generate classification, clustering, generalization, and forecasting that can then be compared against conclusions raised in internal audits or formal financial documents such as 10-Q.

Other techniques such as link analysis, Bayesian networks, decision theory, and sequence matching are also used for fraud detection. A new and novel technique called System properties approach has also been employed where ever rank data is available.

Statistical analysis of research data is the most comprehensive method for determining if data fraud exists. Data fraud as defined by the Office of Research Integrity (ORI) includes fabrication, falsification and plagiarism.

== Machine learning and data mining ==
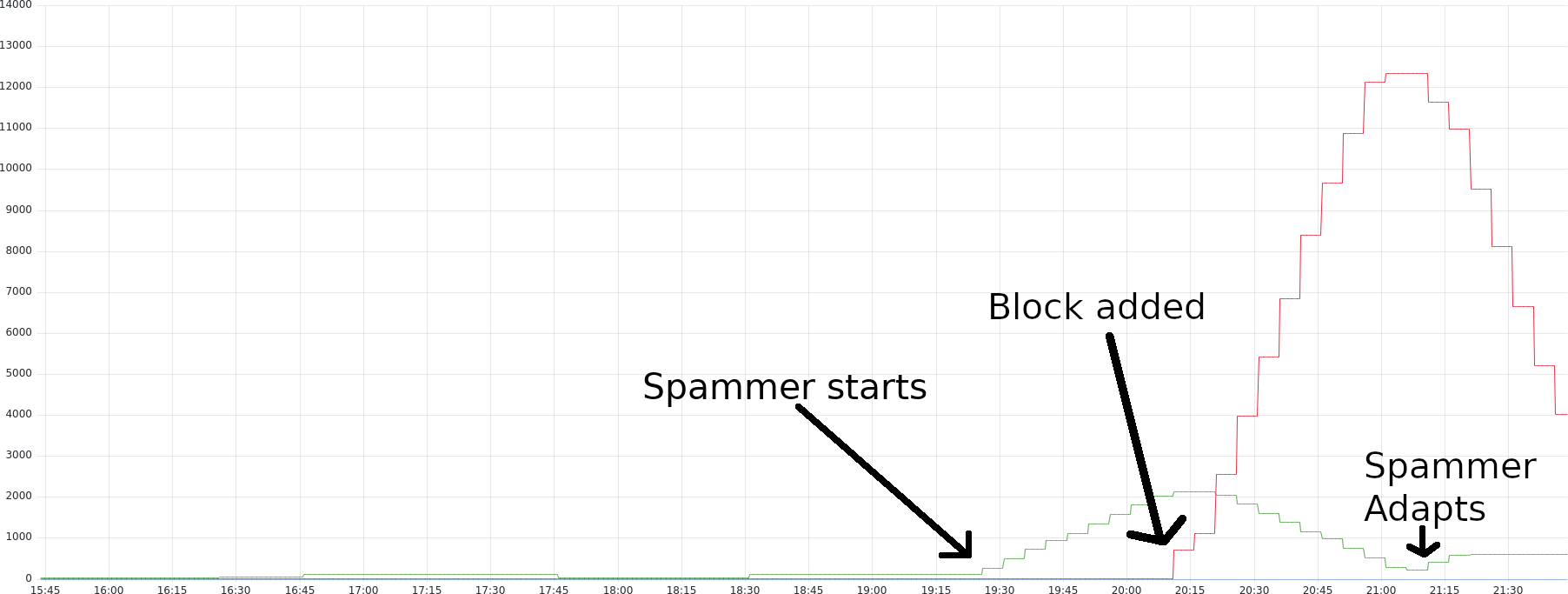
Histogram of fraud

Early data analysis techniques were oriented toward extracting quantitative and statistical data characteristics. These techniques facilitate useful data interpretations and can help to get better insights into the processes behind the data. Although the traditional data analysis techniques can indirectly lead us to knowledge, it is still created by human analysts.

To go beyond, a data analysis system has to be equipped with a substantial amount of background knowledge, and be able to perform reasoning tasks involving that knowledge and the data provided. In effort to meet this goal, researchers have turned to ideas from the machine learning field. This is a natural source of ideas, since the machine learning task can be described as turning background knowledge and examples (input) into knowledge (output).

If data mining results in discovering meaningful patterns, data turns into information. Information or patterns that are novel, valid and potentially useful are not merely information, but knowledge. One speaks of discovering knowledge, before hidden in the huge amount of data, but now revealed.

The machine learning and artificial intelligence solutions may be classified into two categories: 'supervised' and 'unsupervised' learning. These methods seek for accounts, customers, suppliers, etc. that behave 'unusually' in order to output suspicion scores, rules or visual anomalies, depending on the method.

Whether supervised or unsupervised methods are used, note that the output gives us only an indication of fraud likelihood. No stand alone statistical analysis can assure that a particular object is a fraudulent one, but they can identify them with very high degrees of accuracy. As a result, effective collaboration between machine learning model and human analysts is vital to the success of fraud detection applications.

=== Supervised learning ===
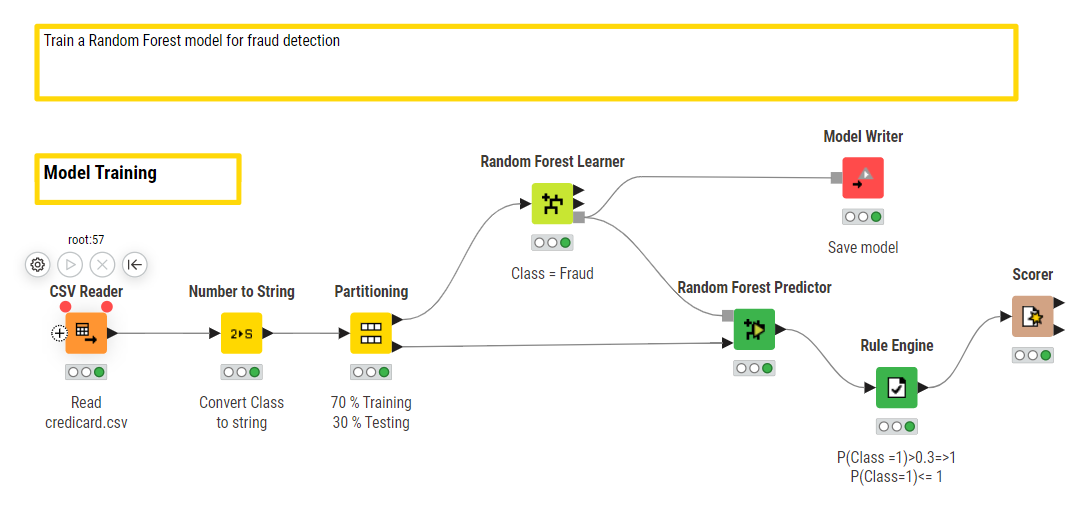
Training a random forest for fraud detection

In supervised learning, a random sub-sample of all records is taken and manually classified as either 'fraudulent' or 'non-fraudulent' (task can be decomposed on more classes to meet algorithm requirements). Relatively rare events such as fraud may need to be over sampled to get a big enough sample size. These manually classified records are then used to train a supervised machine learning algorithm. After building a model using this training data, the algorithm should be able to classify new records as either fraudulent or non-fraudulent.

Supervised neural networks, fuzzy neural nets, and combinations of neural nets and rules, have been extensively explored and used for detecting fraud in mobile phone networks and financial statement fraud.

Bayesian learning neural network is implemented for credit card fraud detection, telecommunications fraud, auto claim fraud detection, and medical insurance fraud.

Hybrid knowledge/statistical-based systems, where expert knowledge is integrated with statistical power, use a series of data mining techniques for the purpose of detecting cellular clone fraud. Specifically, a rule-learning program to uncover indicators of fraudulent behaviour from a large database of customer transactions is implemented.

Cahill et al. (2000) design a fraud signature, based on data of fraudulent calls, to detect telecommunications fraud. For scoring a call for fraud its probability under the account signature is compared to its probability under a fraud signature. The fraud signature is updated sequentially, enabling event-driven fraud detection.

Link analysis comprehends a different approach. It relates known fraudsters to other individuals, using record linkage and social network methods.

This type of detection is only able to detect frauds similar to those which have occurred previously and been classified by a human. To detect a novel type of fraud may require the use of an unsupervised machine learning algorithm.

=== Unsupervised learning ===
In contrast, unsupervised methods don't make use of labelled records.

Bolton and Hand use Peer Group Analysis and Break Point Analysis applied on spending behaviour in credit card accounts. Peer Group Analysis detects individual objects that begin to behave in a way different from objects to which they had previously been similar. Another tool Bolton and Hand develop for behavioural fraud detection is Break Point Analysis. Unlike Peer Group Analysis, Break Point Analysis operates on the account level. A break point is an observation where anomalous behaviour for a particular account is detected. Both the tools are applied on spending behaviour in credit card accounts.

A combination of unsupervised and supervised methods for credit card fraud detection is in Carcillo et al (2019).

== Geolocation ==
Online retailers and payment processors use geolocation to detect possible credit card fraud by comparing the user's location to the billing address on the account or the shipping address provided. A mismatch – an order placed from the US on an account number from Tokyo, for example – is a strong indicator of potential fraud. IP address geolocation can be also used in fraud detection to match billing address postal code or area code. Banks can prevent "phishing" attacks, money laundering and other security breaches by determining the user's location as part of the authentication process. Whois databases can also help verify IP addresses and registrants.

Government, law enforcement and corporate security teams use geolocation as an investigatory tool, tracking the Internet routes of online attackers to find the perpetrators and prevent future attacks from the same location.

== Available datasets ==
A major limitation for the validation of existing fraud detection methods is the lack of public datasets. One of the few examples is the Credit Card Fraud Detection dataset made available by the ULB Machine Learning Group.

== See also ==
- Fraud
- Fraud deterrence
- Profiling (information science)
- Data mining
- Geolocation software
- Neural networks
- Artificial intelligence
- Patterns
- Data clustering
- Statistics
- Labelling
- Decision tree learning
- Regression analysis
- Synthetic data
- Benford's law
- Beneish M-score
