= Javier Estrada González =

Mexican politician

- Born: 4 August 1967 (age 58); Morelos, Mexico
- Occupation: Politician
- Political party: PVEM

Faustino Javier Estrada González (born 4 August 1967) is a Mexican politician from the Ecologist Green Party of Mexico. From 2006 to 2009 he served as Deputy of the LX Legislature of the Mexican Congress representing Morelos.
