= Joel Greenblatt =

American businessman and academic (born 1957)

- Born: December 13, 1957 (age 68); Great Neck, New York, U.S.
- Education: University of Pennsylvania (BS, MBA)
- Occupations: Managing Principal and Co-Chief Investment Officer of Gotham Asset Management; Former Adjunct Professor at Columbia Business School
- Website: Gotham Asset Management; Columbia Business School Faculty

Joel Greenblatt (born December 13, 1957) is an American academic, hedge fund manager, investor, and writer. He is a value investor, alumnus of the Wharton School of the University of Pennsylvania, and adjunct professor at the Columbia University Graduate School of Business. He runs Gotham Asset Management with his partner, Robert Goldstein. Greenblatt is an Emeritus Trustee of the University of Pennsylvania, a trustee on the Penn Medicine Board, and a former chairman and trustee of Penn’s Graduate School of Education. He is the former chairman of the board of Alliant Techsystems (1994–1995) and founder of the New York Securities Auction Corporation.

== Early life and education ==
Greenblatt was born in Great Neck, New York. Greenblatt is a graduate of The Wharton School at the University of Pennsylvania, receiving his B.S., summa cum laude, in 1979 and M.B.A. in 1980. At Wharton, his paper with Rich Pzena and Bruce Newberg, "How the small investor can beat the market," was published in The Journal of Portfolio Management. Greenblatt spent one year studying law at Stanford Law School in California before dropping out to pursue a career in finance.

== Career in finance ==
=== From Gotham Capital To Gotham Asset Management ===
In 1985, Greenblatt started a hedge fund, Gotham Capital, with $7 million, most of which was provided by "junk-bond king" Michael Milken. Robert Goldstein joined Gotham Capital in 1989. At Gotham Capital between 1985 and 1994, Greenblatt presided over an annualized return of 50% "after all expenses" but "before general partner's incentive allocation" fees; or 30%, net of all fees.) Gotham specialized in "special situations" like spinoffs and other corporate restructurings". In January 1995 Gotham returned all capital of outside partners (approximately $500 million).

From 1995 to 2009, Gotham Capital was closed to outside investors.

In 2000, Gotham Capital helped Michael Burry create his hedge fund Scion Capital by buying 25% of its capital for one million dollars after taxes. In October 2006, Gotham's investment in the funds managed by Scion amounted to $100 million. Gotham exited its investments both in the managed funds by Scion Capital and as a shareholder.

In 2008, Gotham Asset Management, LLC was created as "the successor to the investment advisory business of Gotham Capital". Gotham manages long and short private funds, mutual funds, ETFs and managed accounts. As of March 2026, Gotham Asset Management, LLC managed $32.6 billion.

=== Value Investing Professor ===
Greenblatt served as an adjunct professor teaching value investing classes for MBA students at Columbia University's Graduate School of Business for over 20 years.

=== Value Investors Club ===
Greenblatt co-founded a website with John Petry called the Value Investors Club, where investors approved through an application process exchange value and special situation investment ideas. Membership is capped at 250 members and is considered highly prestigious. A 2012 academic study showed that the recommendations of the members of the club do in fact appear to generate significant abnormal profits. The club awards $5000 bimonthly to members who provide the best advice.

=== Magic Formula Investing ===
Greenblatt's book The Little Book That Beats the Market (Wiley, 2005 & 2010) introduced the investment strategy of "magic formula investing", a method for determining which stocks to buy: "cheap and good companies" with a high earnings yield and a high return on invested capital. His strategy is featured in The Guru Investor by John P. Reese. Several studies from around the world have found Greenblat's formula tends to result in long-term outperformance relative to market averages, but is also associated with significantly higher short-term volatility and sharper drawdowns due to his concentrated approach of 20–30 stocks.

In October 2009, Greenblatt launched a website for Formula Investing, providing an online tool that follows the investment strategy described in his book.

== Author ==
Greenblatt’s first book, You Can Be a Stock Market Genius: Uncover the Secret Hiding Places of Stock Market Profits, was released in 1997. Greenblatt published his second book, The Little Book That Beats the Market in 2005, a New York Times Best-Seller that sold over 300,000 copies. After the 2008 financial crisis, The Little Book was updated and re-released in 2010 as The Little Book that Still Beats the Market.

Greenblatt’s book, The Big Secret for the Small Investor: A New Route to Long-Term Investment Success, was released in 2011.

In 2020, Greenblatt shared an investor’s perspective on building an economy that works for all in his book Common Sense: The Investor’s Guide to Equality, Opportunity, and Growth.

== Philanthropy ==
In 2002, Greenblatt donated $2.5 million to P.S. 65Q, a public elementary school in the borough of Queens, whose students come largely from the neighborhood's South American and South Asian immigrant communities. This investment was equal to about $1,000 per student per year over five years.

In 2006, Greenblatt co-founded the Success Academy Charter Schools, then known as the Harlem Success Academy Charter School, an elementary school in the city's historically African-American neighborhood.

He has also served on the boards of the Institute for Student Achievement and the Davidson School of the Jewish Theological Seminary.

During 2007 and 2008, Joel Greenblatt, Robert Goldstein and Gary Curhan created a website, inspired by the Value Investors Club, to spur idea sharing in order to advance cancer research. The $1 million Gotham Prize for Cancer Research was awarded in 2008 to Alexander Varshavsky for trying to find a potentially vulnerable feature of cancer cells that won't change during tumor progression.

Greenblatt is a founding Master Player of the Portfolios with Purpose virtual stock trading contest.

== Bibliography ==
- Greenblatt, Joel (1997). You Can Be a Stock Market Genius: Uncover the Secret Hiding Places of Stock Market Profits. New York: Simon & Schuster. ISBN 0-684-83213-5.
- Greenblatt, Joel (2006). The Little Book That Beats the Market. Hoboken, NJ: John Wiley & Sons. ISBN 0-471-73306-7. Updated 2010 version : The Little Book that Still Beats the Market. ISBN 978-0470624159.
- Greenblatt, Joel (2011). The Big Secret for the Small Investor: A New Route to Long-Term Investment Success. New York: Crown Publishing Group. ISBN 978-0-385-52507-7.
- Greenblatt, Joel (2011). Le petit livre qui bat le marché [The Little Book That Beats the Market] (in French). Translated by Monet, Roland. Hendaye, France: Valor Editions. ISBN 978-2-36117-001-1.
