= Javier Estrada (professor) =

Spanish-Argentinian finance professor

- Born: 12 November 1964; Argentina
- Education: Universidad de La Plata (BSc); University of Illinois at Urbana–Champaign (MSc, PhD)
- Occupations: Finance professor; Financial author
- Website: Javier Estrada

Javier Estrada (born 12 November 1964), is a Spanish-Argentinian finance professor and finance author. Estrada is a professor of finance at the IESE Business School in Barcelona, Spain, and specializes in portfolio management, risk management, and wealth management. He was educated at the Universidad de La Plata, and the University of Illinois at Urbana–Champaign. Estrada has published a number of books on finance. He is also regularly quoted in the main financial news media, including The Wall Street Journal, The Financial Times, Bloomberg, Barron's, Forbes, and other financial media.

== Published works ==
- Estrada, Javier (May 2011). FT Guide to Understanding Finance (2nd ed.). The Financial Times. ISBN 978-0071432405.
- Estrada, Javier (January 2011). The Essential Financial Toolkit. Palgrave Macmillan. ISBN 978-0230283596.
- Estrada, Javier (August 2005). Finance in a Nutshell. Prentice Hall. ISBN 978-0273675402.

== See also ==
- Fed model
