= Joseph Piotroski =

Joseph D. Piotroski is the Robert K. Jaedicke Professor of Accounting at Stanford University's Graduate School of Business, and a senior fellow at the Asian Bureau of Finance and Economic Research (ABFER). Prior to joining Stanford in 2007, Piotroski was at the University of Chicago Booth School of Business (1999–2007).

Piotroski specializes in financial reporting, and is well known in the investing industry for a 2000 paper, entitled Value Investing: The Use of Historical Financial Statement Information to Separate Winners from Losers. In the piece, Piotroski laid out a way (Piotroski F-score) to buy and short stocks using several accounting-based criteria. His back-testing showed that the method would have produced returns above the broader market averages over a two-decade period.

Piotroski was a member of the Editorial Advisory Boards of The Accounting Review, the Journal of Accounting Research, and the Journal of Accounting and Economics. He currently serves on the editorial advisory boards of the Review of Accounting Studies, and Journal of Business Finance & Accounting. His research has been cited in publications such as Bloomberg BusinessWeek, SmartMoney Magazine, and Investor's Business Daily.

== Education and early career ==
Piotroski earned a B.S. in accounting from the University of Illinois in 1989. He became a certified public accountant in the state of Illinois that same year. From 1989 to 1992, he was a tax associate at Coopers & Lybrand.

Piotroski earned an M.B.A. in finance from Indiana University in 1994 and earned his Ph.D. in accounting from the University of Michigan in 1999. In 2000, his dissertation won the American Accounting Association Best Dissertation Award, Financial Reporting Section.

== Value investing research ==
Piotroski received widespread publicity within the investment community for his 2000 paper, Value Investing: The Use of Historical Financial Statement Information to Separate Winners from Losers, which appeared in the Journal of Accounting Research (Vol. 38, Supplement: Studies on Accounting Information and the Economics of the Firm).

The paper examined whether a simple accounting-based fundamental analysis stock selection strategy, when applied to a broad portfolio of high book-to-market firms, could impact returns for investors. He began by limiting his search to firms whose book/market ratios (the inverse of the price/book ratio) were in the top 20% of the market. He then ran those firms through an array of tests involving their balance sheets and income statements, using such metrics as the return on assets rate, current ratio, change in gross margin, and change in asset turnover. The Piotroski F-score is a 9-point valuation metric derived on this research.

Through back-testing, Piotroski found that buying the top stocks in the market according to his methodology and shorting those that got the worst scores would have resulted in 23% annualized gains from 1976 through 1996, more than double the S&P 500 broad market index return. His findings were made available to a wider audience via SmartMoney magazine and Bloomberg BusinessWeek.
