= John Neff (investor) =

American money manager (1931–2019)

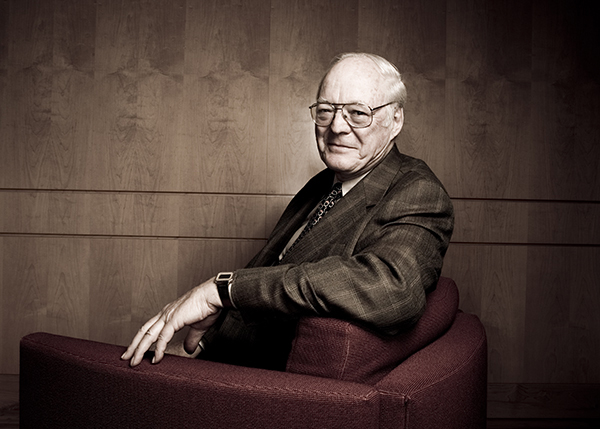
- John Neff, mutual fund manager, at his office in Radnor, Pennsylvania in 2005
- Born: September 19, 1931; Wauseon, Ohio, U.S.
- Died: June 4, 2019 (aged 87); Berwyn, Pennsylvania, U.S.
- Other name: "The Professional's Professional"
- Education: University of Toledo; Case Western Reserve University
- Occupations: Investor, mutual fund manager, and philanthropist
- Known for: Managing the Vanguard Windsor Fund
- Spouse: Lillian Neff

John B. Neff (September 19, 1931 – June 4, 2019) was an American investor, mutual fund manager, and philanthropist. He was notable for his contrarian and value investing styles as well as for heading Vanguard's Windsor Fund.

Windsor became the highest returning, and subsequently largest mutual fund in existence during Neff's management, eventually closing to new investors for a period in the 1980s. Neff retired from Vanguard in 1995. During Neff's thirty-one-year tenure at Windsor (1964 to 1995), the fund returned 13.7% annually versus 10.6% for the S&P 500.

== Early life and education ==
John Neff was born in 1931 in Wauseon, Ohio. He attended the University of Toledo and graduated summa cum laude in 1955.

He then worked at the National City Bank of Cleveland before attending the School of Business at Western Reserve University, graduating in 1958.

== Investment career ==
In 1964, he joined the Wellington Management Company, a sub-advisor to the Vanguard group of funds. After three years at the company, he was appointed portfolio manager of the Windsor, Gemini, and Qualified Dividend funds. He retired in 1995.

== Investment philosophy ==
Neff referred to his investing style as a low price-to-earnings (P/E) methodology, though others considered Neff a variation of the standard value investor. He was also considered a tactical contrarian investor who placed emphasis on low-tech security analysis, that is, digging into a company and its management and analyzing the books, in contrast to David Dreman, who is more of a statistical contrarian investor. Neff's strategies generated relatively high turnover with an average holding period of three years. One area in which Neff was similar to value investors such as Warren Buffett was in his emphasis on return on equity (ROE), stating that it is the single best measure of management effectiveness. However, differing from many value investors, Neff also focused on predicting the economy and projecting a company's future earnings. Also, Neff liked to choose stocks with high dividend yields, in the 4% to 5% range.

== Personal life ==
He published his autobiography, John Neff On Investing, in 2001.

The Wharton School of the University of Pennsylvania named a professorship (the John B. Neff Professor of Finance) after him. The University of Toledo College of Business named the John B. and Lillian E. Neff Department of Finance in honor of Neff and his wife; the department also houses the John B. and Lillian E. Neff Endowed Chair in Finance.

Neff was married for 63 years to the former Lillian Tulak, who died in 2017. He died after an illness on June 4, 2019.

== See also ==
- John Bogle
- Benjamin Graham
- Value Investing

== Bibliography ==
- John Neff on Investing. by John Neff, S. L. Mintz. Published by John Wiley and Sons, 2001. ISBN 0-471-41792-0.
