= Earnings yield =

Financial ratio

Earning yield is the quotient of earnings per share (E), divided by the share price (P), giving E/P. It is the reciprocal of the P/E ratio.

The earning yield is quoted as a percentage, and therefore allows immediate comparison to prevailing long-term interest rates (e.g. the Fed model).

== Applications ==
The earning yield can be used to compare the earnings of a specific company or group of companies across different sectors and industries against bond yields. Generally, the earnings yields of equities are higher than the yield of risk-free treasury bonds. Some of this may result in dividends, while some may be kept as retained earnings. The market price of stocks may increase or decrease, reflecting the additional risk involved in equity investments. The average P/E ratio for U.S. stocks from 1900 to 2005 is 14, which equates to an earnings yield of over 7%.

The Fed model is an example of a system that uses the earnings yield as a method to assess aggregate stock market valuation levels, although it is disputed.

== Adjusted versions ==
Earning yield is one of the factors discussed in Joel Greenblatt's The Little Book That Beats the Market. However, Greenblatt uses an adjusted earning yield formula to account for the fact that different companies have different debt levels and tax rates.

Earnings Yield = (Earnings Before Interest & Taxes + Depreciation – CapEx) / Enterprise Value (Market Value + Debt – Cash)

This tells you how expensive a company is in relation to the earnings the company generates. When looking at the Earning Yield, we make certain adjustments to a company’s market capitalization to estimate what it would take to buy the entire company. This involves penalizing companies carrying much debt and rewarding those having much cash.

== See also ==
- Dividend yield
- Fed model
