= Mark Ripple =

Mark E. Ripple
- Born: August 30, 1967
- Died: December 17, 2010 (aged 43); Arkansas, United States
- Education: Rensselaer Polytechnic Institute
- Occupations: Money manager, horse racing handicapper, author

Mark Ripple was an American money manager, expert horse racing handicapper, and author of Handicapping the Wall Street Way. He was frequently sought after to write articles, having written for American Turf Monthly, The Horse Jockey, CBS, and Southern Gaming Magazine.

He was featured in American Turf Monthly and Motley Fool, and had been a featured financial commentator for CBS Market Watch. Mark gave lectures at numerous colleges including the University of Pennsylvania, Hudson Valley Community College, and Rensselaer Polytechnic Institute.

== Early life and education ==
Ripple was born August 30, 1967. After graduating from Hudson Valley Community College as a President's List Student, Ripple commenced to further his studies at Rensselaer Polytechnic Institute until he was recruited as New York State's youngest investment banker, at age 21, by Thomas James Associates of Rochester, New York.

== Career ==
=== Thomas James Associates ===
He spent one year at the fledgling firm and was drafted by Merrill Lynch.

=== Merrill Lynch ===
While at Merrill Lynch, he held a variety of responsibilities in sales management, in both debt and equities, as well as product risk management, and investment banking.

=== Prudential Bache ===
Ripple has also worked in the Mergers and Acquisitions Group of Prudential Securities Incorporated.

=== PVR Investment Holdings ===
Ripple continues to invest for a very select group of clients with his British-Canadian partner, PVR Investment Holdings.

== Bibliography ==
- Handicapping the Wall Street Way ISBN 9781581501261

In 2005, Ripple authored a ground-breaking piece of work on horse racing handicapping. Handicapping the Wall Street Way shows how Ripple successfully applies theories learned from 20 years in the securities investment game to horse racing.

Ripple based his theories on market inefficiencies. The odds on a horse or a stock's price is normally very efficient, because the public sets the prices and gives correct values. We see this when odds-on favorites finish in the money more often than not, and blue chip stocks steadily rise in value over time. Clearly, this is a slow way to turn a profit. However, irrational behavior by the betting public, be they stock investors or horseplayers, will cause inefficient markets. He uses the parallel of the dot-com boom of the late 1990s and the Belmont Stakes with a Triple Crown on the line to demonstrate the most extreme examples of market inefficiency, and how taking a contrarian approach can lead to profitability. Investors who bought dot-com shares at the height of the boom and horseplayers who bet on War Emblem, Funny Cide, and Smarty Jones at the Belmont all took a loss on their wagers.

One angle of betting that other race handicapping books rarely touch on, but is always discussed by financial advisors, is risk management, prescribing a betting strategy corresponding to the level of risk the bettor is willing to take. With greater risk, there is a corresponding greater potential profit but with the trade-off of more money that can be lost. Ripple was the first to use a simple questionnaire to determine what level of risk the reader is comfortable with, and then the reader can implement the corresponding betting strategies.

Ripple recognizes that it is not "one size fits all" and has tailored strategies to reflect this.

== Philanthropy and personal life ==
Ripple was also Co-Founder of the Elizabeth K. Ripple Memorial Scholarship Fund, founded in honor of his sister, which provides scholarships for students attending Hudson Valley Community College's Respiratory Therapy Program. He died from complications of liver disease on December 17, 2010, in Arkansas.
