= Institutional Brokers' Estimate System =

Service estimating corporate earnings

The Institutional Brokers' Estimate System (I/B/E/S) is a service founded by the New York brokerage firm Lynch, Jones & Ryan and Technimetrics, Inc. I/B/E/S began collecting earnings estimates for U.S. companies around 1976 and used the raw data to calculate statistical time series for each company. The data subsequently was used as the basis for articles in academic finance journals attempting to demonstrate that changes in consensus earnings estimates could identify opportunities to capture excess returns in subsequent periods. After starting with annual earnings estimates and estimates of "Long Term Growth," the database later was expanded to include quarterly earnings estimates. This allowed for the analysis of "Quarterly Earnings Surprises." Other innovations made possible by the I/B/E/S data included estimates for various equity indexes on a "top down" basis (made by strategists and economists) and estimates made on a "bottom up" basis (by individual analysts) for those same indexes. In the mid-1980s I/B/E/S began to expand its dataset to include companies trading in international markets. Lynch, Jones was sold to Citigroup in 1986. Barra bought I/B/E/S in 1993, selling it to Primark Corp (not be confused with Primark Stores Ltd) two years later. Thomson Financial purchased Primark in 2000. Successor company Thomson Reuters spun off its financial division under the name Refinitiv in 2018, which itself became a subsidiary of LSEG in Jan 2021.

The I/B/E/S database currently covers over 40,000 companies in 70 markets. It provides to a client base of 50,000 institutional money managers. More than 900 firms contribute data to I/B/E/S, from the largest global houses to regional and local brokers, with US data back to 1976 and international data back to 1987.

It is unclear why slashes are used in the acronym, vs. periods or nothing at all, but this is its common usage. Users of the data have hypothesized it to be to "demonstrate their uniqueness as a database", a la using "@" instead of "at".

== I/B/E/S Current Forecast Data ==
The I/B/E/S current forecast database is offered on a summary (consensus) level or detailed (analyst-by-analyst) basis. With over 33 data items that are updated as often as five times a day, it is designed to help portfolio managers and analysts identify, manipulate, and analyze exceptional information for over 40,000 equities worldwide.

== I/B/E/S Historical Forecasts ==
I/B/E/S History is the only statistically significant historical estimate database in the business. Starting in 1976 for US forecasts and 1987 for International forecasts, I/B/E/S History contains records on over 45,000 companies across 70 markets and presents a unique opportunity for back testing investment theories in a variety of global market conditions. Such research against historical trends and market conditions can provide a confident glimpse into future results.

There are two versions of the I/B/E/S earnings estimate history, Summary and Detail:

- The Summary History consists of a snapshot of the consensus level data taken monthly. The U.S. edition covers reported earnings estimates and results since January 1976, while the international starts in 1987.
- The Detail History (Analyst Earnings Estimate History) is a timeline of individual analysts' earnings forecasts (daily records at the analyst level). The U.S. edition starts in 1983, while the International edition starts in 1987.

Both data sets are available for US and International stocks. The databases cover 56 countries and 70 markets.
