= David Dreman =

American businessman

- Born: 1936 (age 89–90); Winnipeg, Manitoba, Canada
- Occupation: Chief executive officer

David Dreman (born 1936) is an investor, who founded and is chairman of Dreman Value Management, an investment company.

Dreman has published many scholarly articles and he has written four books. Dreman also writes a column for Forbes magazine. Dreman is on the board of directors of the Institute of Behavioral Finance, publisher of the Journal of Behavioral Finance.

== Personal ==
Dreman was born in Winnipeg, Manitoba, Canada in 1936. His father, Joseph Dreman, was a prominent trader on the Winnipeg Commodity Exchange for many years.

== Education ==
David Dreman graduated from the University of Manitoba in 1958.

== Career ==
After graduating, he worked as director of research for Rauscher Pierce, senior investment officer with Seligman, and senior editor of the Value Line Investment Service. In 1977, he founded his first investment firm, Dreman Value Management, LLC., and has served as its president and chairman.

The Dreman fund family was eventually bought by Kemper, which was then bought by Scudder, which itself was bought by Deutsche Bank. In 2009 his firm chose to hold on to banking stocks as they were crashing, in line with his contrarian value investing philosophy. As a result, his firm was removed from management of his flagship DWS Dreman High Return Equity Fund by the board of Deutsche Bank, citing weak performance.

== Books ==
- Psychology and the Stock Market: Investment Strategy Beyond Random Walk. 1977. American Management Association. ISBN 0-814-45429-1.
- Contrarian Investment Strategy: The Psychology of Stock Market Success. 1980. Random House. ISBN 0-394-42390-9.
- The New Contrarian Investment Strategy. 1982. Random House. ISBN 0-394-52364-4.
- Contrarian Investment Strategies: The Next Generation. 1998. Simon & Schuster. ISBN 0-684-81350-5.
- Contrarian Investment Strategies: The Psychological Edge. 2012. Free Press. ISBN 0-743-29796-2.

== Books About ==
- The Guru Investor: How to Beat the Market Using History's Best Investment Strategies (Wiley 2009)

== Scholarly Articles ==
Dreman has written many more articles. These are just a sampling of some of the more recent articles.

- Do Contrarian Strategies Work Within Industries? David Dreman and Eric Lufkin, 1997. Journal of Investing. abstract
- Analyst Forecast Errors and Their Implications for Security Analysis. David Dreman and M.A. Berry, 1995. Financial Analysts' Journal.
- Investor Overreaction: Evidence that its Basis is Psychological. David Dreman and Eric Lufkin, 2000.
- Bubbles and the Role of Analysts' Forecasts. David Dreman, 2002. The Journal of Psychology and Financial Markets (now The Journal of Behavioral Finance).
- A Report on the March 2001 Investor Sentiment Survey. David Dreman, S. Johnson, D. MacGregor and Paul Slovic, 2001. The Journal of Psychology and Financial Markets (now The Journal of Behavioral Finance). article
