= James O'Shaughnessy (investor) =

American economist (born 1960)

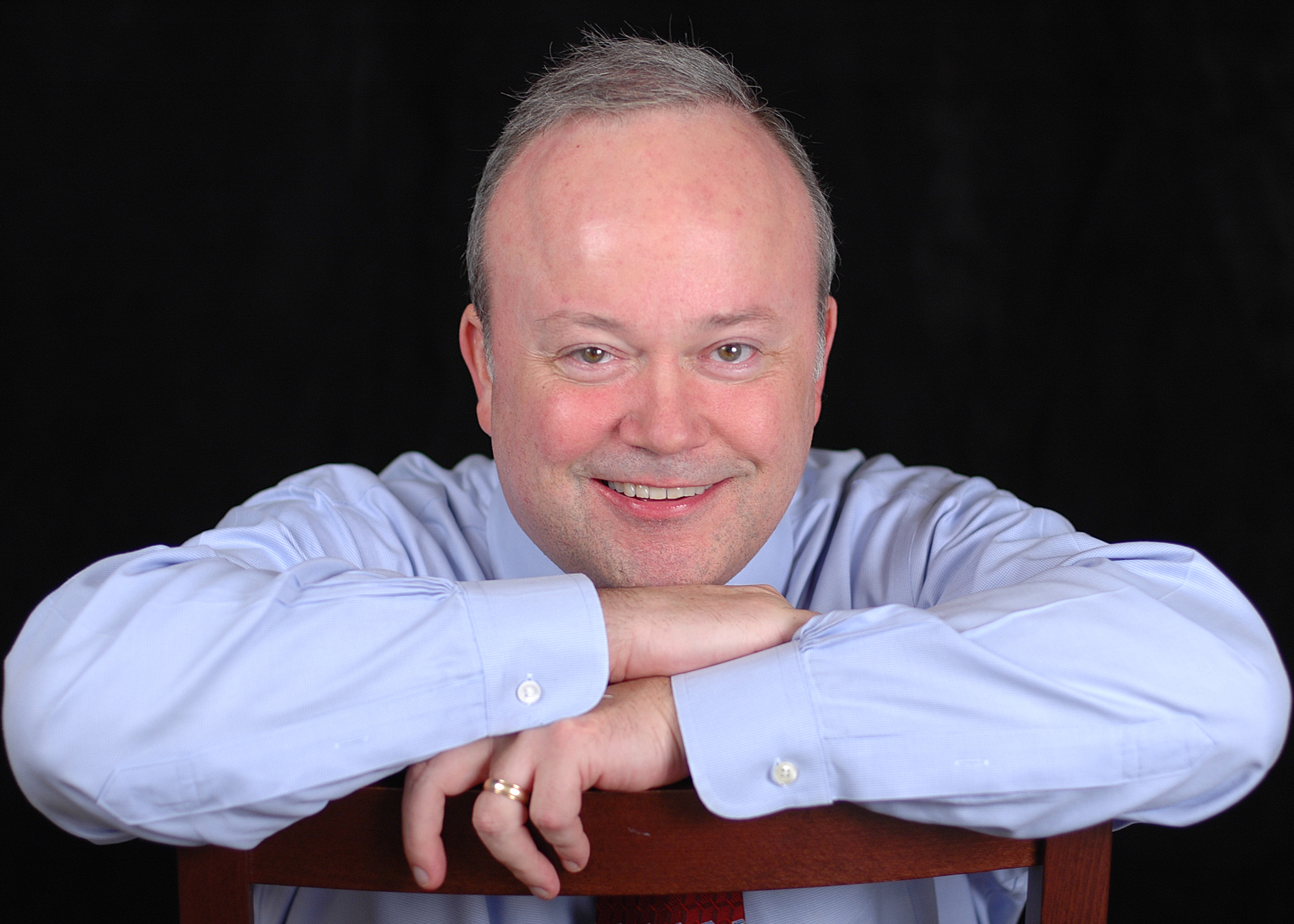
- Born: James Patrick O'Shaughnessy; May 24, 1960 (age 66); Saint Paul, Minnesota, U.S.
- Education: University of Minnesota
- Occupations: Founder, O'Shaughnessy Ventures
- Website: osv.llc

James Patrick O'Shaughnessy (born May 24, 1960) is an American investor and venture capitalist, who is the CEO of O'Shaughnessy Ventures. He is the founder of O'Shaughnessy Asset Management, LLC, an asset management firm that Franklin Templeton later acquired.

O'Shaughnessy's areas of expertise include quantitative equity analysis, portfolio management, research decisions, and investment models. He has authored several books that use Standard & Poor's Compustat database to provide extensive quantitative analysis of stock market performance. O'Shaughnessy has been awarded several U.S. patents for his investment strategies and was recognized as a legendary investor by Forbes.com.

== Early life and education ==
James P. O'Shaughnessy was born and raised in Saint Paul, Minnesota, where he attended Saint Thomas Academy as a youth. His fascination with the stock market began at an early age when he started to manually track characteristics common to the 30 companies in the Dow Jones Industrial Average stock index. After studying international economics and business diplomacy at the School of Foreign Service of Georgetown University, O'Shaughnessy graduated with a Bachelor of Arts in economics from the University of Minnesota in 1986.

O'Shaughnessy continued to apply his research of the stock market, and in 1994, his first book, Invest Like the Best, was published, followed by the first edition of What Works on Wall Street in 1997, How to Retire Rich in 1998, and Predicting the Markets of Tomorrow in 2006.

== Career ==
=== Mutual funds ===
O'Shaughnessy started his own mutual funds under the names Cornerstone Growth and Cornerstone Value in 1996.

In 1997, the Royal Bank of Canada (RBC) launched the RBC O'Shaughnessy mutual funds for Canadian investors. Currently, there are seven mutual funds in the RBC O'Shaughnessy funds family.

==== O'Shaughnessy Capital Management ====
After graduating, O'Shaughnessy worked for a family-owned venture capital firm. During this time, his interest in quantitative research was recognized by a colleague who was on the board of directors with O'Shaughnessy at the St. Paul Chamber Orchestra. The colleague suggested that O'Shaughnessy's research might be well suited for pension plan management. In 1988, O'Shaughnessy started O'Shaughnessy Capital Management, Inc. and began consulting large pension funds and foundations.

==== Netfolio ====
In 1999, O'Shaughnessy started Netfolio, The Personal Fund Company, to offer individual investors the ability to build their own diversified portfolio over the internet. The company was closed in 2001. As part of Netfolio's concentration on "personal funds", O'Shaughnessy Capital Management sold its mutual fund family to Hennessy Advisors in June 2000.

==== Bear Stearns Asset Management ====
In 2001, O'Shaughnessy and his team from O'Shaughnessy Capital Management moved to Bear Stearns Asset Management (BSAM), where O'Shaughnessy was a senior managing director and the executive director of Systematic Equity.

=== O'Shaughnessy Asset Management ===
In 2007, O'Shaughnessy reached an agreement with Bear Stearns to spin his Systematic team out of BSAM to form O'Shaughnessy Asset Management, LLC. O'Shaughnessy Asset Management was acquired by Franklin Templeton in 2021. O'Shaughnessy later announced that he would retire at the end of 2022.

==== O'Shaughnessy Ventures ====
In January 2023, O'Shaughnessy launched his self-described passion project, O'Shaughnessy Ventures, a "creative company that inspires creators". O'Shaughnessy Ventures focuses on 4 specific areas: Infinite Adventures, Infinite Films, Infinite Media, and the O'Shaughnessy Fellowships program.

In addition to its flagship investment into Stability Ai, O'Shaughnessy Ventures' other key investments include Positive Sum, Chaotic Capital, Permanent Equity, Anchorless Bangladesh, Prefect, Synthesis School, Eighty-Seven Capital, Entrepreneur First, and Ladder.

== Personal life ==
O'Shaughnessy married his wife Melissa in August 1982. O'Shaughnessy has three children and five grandchildren.

In 1991, he moved his family to Greenwich, Connecticut, to be closer to the New York area, where most of his business was located.

O'Shaughnessy is the former chairman of the board for the Chamber Music Society of Lincoln Center and currently serves as the chair of the capital campaign for CMS. He is also a member of the board of trustees for Common Good. In September 2022, O'Shaughnessy joined the board of directors for Stability AI as its executive chair.

== Bibliography ==
=== Books authored by ===
- Invest Like the Best: Using Your Computer to Unlock the Secrets of the Top Money Managers, 1994, McGraw-Hill. ISBN 0-07-047984-4.
- How to Retire Rich: Time-Tested Strategies to Beat The Market and Retire in Style, 1998, Broadway Books. ISBN 0-7679-0072-3.
- What Works on Wall Street: A Guide to the Best-Performing Investment Strategies of All Time, 3rd Edition, 2005, McGraw-Hill. ISBN 0-07-145225-7. (1st Edition, 1997, ISBN 0-07-047985-2; 2nd Edition, 1998, ISBN 0-07-048246-2)
- Predicting the Markets of Tomorrow: A Contrarian Investment Strategy for the Next Twenty Years, 2006, Penguin Group. ISBN 1-59184-108-9.

=== Commentary authored by ===
- "A Generational Opportunity." Yahoo! Finance, March 17, 2009.
- "Successful Active Stock Investing is Hard: Here are Seven Traits that I Believe are Required for Active Investors to Win in the Long Term." Yahoo! Finance, March 13, 2017.
- "What Works on Wall Street." Talks at Google, March 21, 2017 (Published April 5, 2017).

=== Books about ===
- Angenfelt, Magnus (2013). The World's 99 Greatest Investors: The Secret of Success. Sweden: Roos & Tegner. pp. 158–159. ISBN 978-91-86691-53-0.
- Reese, John P.; Todd Glassman (2002). The Market Gurus: Stock Investing Strategies You Can Use from Wall Street's Best. Chicago, IL: Dearborn Trade Publishing, a Kaplan Professional Company. ISBN 0-7931-4595-3.
- Reese, John P.; Jack M. Forehand (2009). The Guru Investor: How to Beat the Market Using History's Best Investment Strategies. Hoboken, NJ: John Wiley & Sons. ISBN 978-0-470-37709-3.
- Sincere, Michael (1999). 101 Investment Lessons from the Wizards of Wall Street. Franklin Lakes, NJ: Career Press. pp. 20–24, 63, 121, 159–160, 227. ISBN 1-56414-382-1.
- Fisher, Amy (2015). Top 101 Industry Experts: Insights & Ideas to Inspire You. Uniondale, NY: Worldwide Publishing. pp. 7–10. ISBN 978-1-60758-778-1.

== See also ==
- RBC Asset Management
- Bear Stearns Asset Management
