= Making Globalization Work =

- Author: Stiglitz, Joseph
- Language: English
- Genre: Non-fiction
- Publisher: W.W. Norton & Company, Inc.
- Publication date: September 2006
- Publication place: United States
- ISBN: 0-393-06122-1
- OCLC: 70219850
- Dewey Decimal: 337 22
- LC Class: HF1359 .S753 2006

Making Globalization Work is a book written by Nobel Prize laureate Joseph E. Stiglitz, who also wrote Globalization and Its Discontents and several other books.

== Overview ==
The first major protest in Seattle, Washington against the World Trade Organization (WTO) and its role in promoting economic globalization came as a surprise to many, considering the positive impacts globalization was supposed to bring. According to Stiglitz, this was the first step in a widespread recognition that globalization was all “too good to be true.” Along with globalization comes myriad concerns and problems, says Stiglitz.

1. The first concern being that the rules governing globalization favors developed countries, while the developing countries sink even lower.
2. Second, globalization only regards monetary value of items, rather than other factors involved; one being the environment.
3. The next concern is how developing countries are controlled by globalization and the negative effects it can have on their democracies. Developing countries borrow a large amount of funds from other countries and the World Bank which essentially causes them to give up the benefits of their democracy because of the strings attached to the loan repayment.
4. The fourth concern regarding globalization is the notion that it does not live up to its original expectations. Globalization was advertised to boost countries economically; however, it has not shown improvement in developed nor developing countries.
5. Last but not least, the new system of globalization has basically forced a new economic system on developing countries. This new economic system is seen as the “Americanization” (Stiglitz, Page 9) of their policies as well as culture. This has caused quite a bit of resentment and financial damage.

In addition to these concerns, Stiglitz highlights that individual persons and whole countries are being victimized by globalization.

Globalization had succeeded in unifying people from around the world — against globalization. Factory workers in the United States saw their jobs being threatened by competition from China. Farmers in developing countries saw their jobs being threatened by the highly subsidized corn and other crops from the United States. Workers in Europe saw hard-fought-for job protections being assailed in the name of globalization. AIDS activists saw a new trade agreement raising the prices of drugs to levels that were unaffordable in much of the world. Environmentalists felt that globalization undermined their decade long struggle to establish regulations to preserve our natural heritage. Those who wanted to protect and develop their own cultural heritage saw too the intrusions of globalization.

— Stiglitz, 2006, p. 7

Stiglitz then goes on to provide an overview of how we might “reform” globalization, by noting representatives of the world’s national governments attended the Millennium Summit and signed the Millennium Development Goals, pledging to cut poverty in half by 2015. Additionally, the International Monetary Fund (IMF) had previously been focusing more on inflation, rather than employment and income; however, they have shifted their focus in hopes of reducing poverty. Stiglitz states that countries who seek financial assistance have in the past been asked to meet an outrageous number of conditions, in exchange for the aid. This was one of the most common complaints towards the IMF and the World Bank. They have heard these complaints and have since greatly reduced the conditionality. The G8 group met for their annual meeting in 2005 and had agreed to write off debt owed by the 18 poorest countries in the world as an attempt to help with the global poverty issue. As regards the aspiration to make trade fair,

1. originally, opening the market was done in hopes of helping the economy; however, the rights between the developing and developed countries have been skewed, and
2. the last trade agreement actually put the poorest countries in a situation in which they were worse off than to begin with.

Stiglitz focuses on the limitations of liberalization briefly to say the results of liberalization never lived up to the expectations; the developing countries were not able to follow through because their economic and political systems simply could not cope with the pressures.

Finally, Stiglitz also argues that protecting the environment is one of the most important issues and countries must work together to lessen the effects of global warming. Successful development in countries such as India and China has only increased energy usage and also the use of natural resources. People from all over the world must adjust their lifestyle in order to reverse the effects of global warming.

In order to see more success through globalization, there must be more use made of global governance structures. The voices of all, internationally, must be heard, rather than having the voice of the developed countries speak over those of the developing countries.

== Reviews ==
It is good to hear the arguments of Third World nations about this inequitable state of affairs. Americans should hear them more often.

But Stiglitz is hardly evenhanded; he is making a case. He brushes aside rich-country bellyaches, such as the U.S. trade deficit with China. He caricatures the views of his opponents, saying they believe that their undiluted version of free trade will make everyone better off, when what they actually believe is that by lowering prices it will make most people better off. Stiglitz highlights the flaws of markets, but he is not equally tough on the deficiencies of government economic policies or the failures of foreign aid.

His book is flavored with a deep distaste for inequality.

— Bruce Ramsey, The Seattle Times

Likelihood of becoming a Hollywood blockbuster: Not a Hollywood blockbuster, but an outstanding bestseller certainly, one that will again rile many in western political office and the economic community. Dr. Stiglitz's open, honest style of writing and appeal to experts and non-experts alike – coupled with the ever-heightened debate over globalization – will guarantee this book's enduring success.

— Chris Wilson, InTheNews.Co.UK

Attacking the idea of free-for-all markets in a superfluous debate with conservative purists only overshadows Dr. Stiglitz’s practical suggestions, like adding labour and environmental ministers to trade negotiations.

— Stephen Kotkin, The New York Times

What the world needs is not another book on the failures of ill-defined globalisation. What we need is hope.

— Bill Jamieson, The Scotsman

Joseph Stiglitz’s new book, Making Globalization Work, is an imaginative and, above all, practical vision for a successful and equitable world.

— World Affairs Council
