= Heidemarie Wieczorek-Zeul =

German politician (SPD) (born 1942)

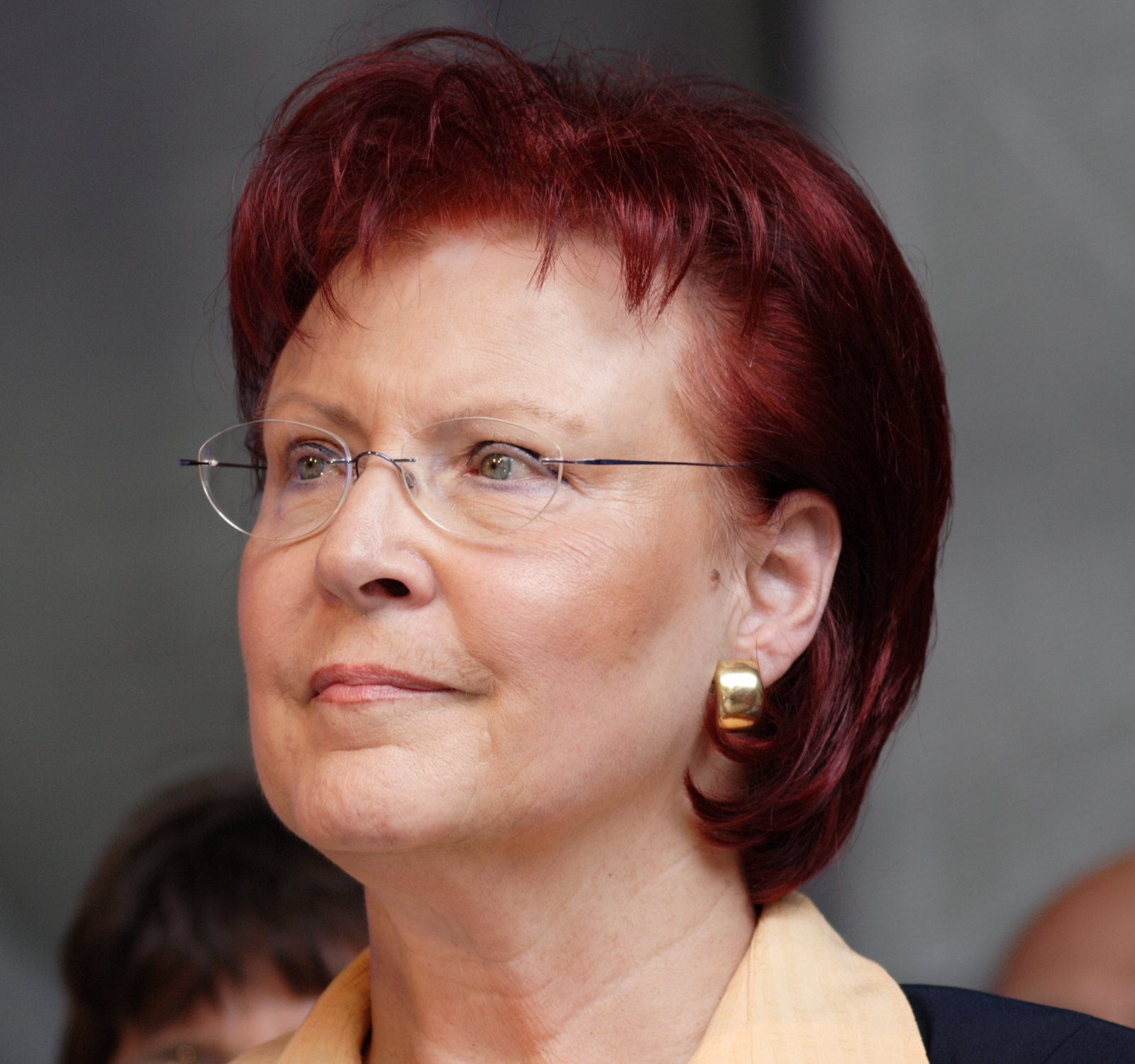
- Wieczorek-Zeul in 2009

Minister for Economic Cooperation and Development
- In office 27 October 1998 – 27 October 2009
- Chancellor: Gerhard Schröder; Angela Merkel
- Preceded by: Carl-Dieter Spranger
- Succeeded by: Dirk Niebel

Member of the Bundestag; from Hesse
- In office 18 February 1987 – 22 October 2013
- Constituency: State list (1987–1998); Wiesbaden (1998–2009); State list (2009–2013)

Member of the European Parliament; for West Germany
- In office 17 July 1979 – 1 March 1987
- Preceded by: Constituency established
- Succeeded by: Barbara Schmidbauer

Personal details
- Born: Heidemarie Zeul; 21 November 1942 (age 83) Frankfurt am Main, Germany
- Party: Social Democratic
- Spouse: Norbert Wieczorek (m. 1965; div. 1979)
- Education: Goethe University Frankfurt
- Profession: Teacher
- Website: heidi-wieczorek-zeul.de

Heidemarie Wieczorek-Zeul (born 21 November 1942) is a German politician and a member of the Social Democratic Party (SPD) since 1965.

== Early life and career ==
Wieczorek-Zeul (pronounced VEE‐choreck TSOIL) began her career as a teacher 1965–1974 at Friedrich Ebert School and 1977–1978 at Georg Büchner School in Rüsselsheim am Main, and subsequently served as Chairwoman of the European Coordination Bureau of International Youth Organizations from 1977 to 1979.

== Political career ==
=== Early beginnings ===
Wieczorek-Zeul is a prominent figure of the Social Democrats' left wing and is often called "Red Heidi". From 1974 to 1977, she was the first woman to chair the Jusos (Young Socialists), the youth organisation of the SPD. In this capacity, she represented the party's then 350,000 members who were under 35. During her time as Juso chief, she drew headlines in 1975 by calling for limit of $2,000 a month on personal income.

From 1977 to 1979, she was President of the European Coordination Bureau of International Youth Organisation (a precursor to the modern European Youth Forum).

=== Member of the European Parliament (1979–1987) ===
Wieczorek-Zeul was elected Member of the European Parliament in the 1979 European elections, the first European elections to be held and also the first international election in history. During her time in Parliament, she was part of the Socialist Group.

Between 1979 and 1984, Wieczorek-Zeul served as vice-chairwoman of the Committee on External Economic Relations. From 1984 to 1987, she was a member of the Committee on Women's Rights. In addition to her committee assignments, she was a member of the Parliament’s delegation for relations with the Gulf States.

=== Member of the German Bundestag (1987–2013) ===
Wieczorek-Zeul first became a member of the Bundestag in the 1987 West German elections, where she joined the Committee on European Affairs. In this capacity, she served as the Social Democrat’s European policy spokeswoman.

After the resignation of party leader Björn Engholm in 1993, she stood for the Social Democrats' candidacy for the chancellor's office, but lost to Rudolf Scharping. Scharping won 40% of all votes cast by the party members, Schröder 33% and Wieczorek-Zeul 27%. It was the first time the party members were asked to elect the new party leader directly. From 1993 to 2005, Wieczorek-Zeul served as deputy chairwoman of the SPD, under the leadership of successive chairmen Rudolf Scharping (1993–1995), Oskar Lafontaine (1995–1999), Gerhard Schröder (1999–2004) and Franz Müntefering (2004–2005).

From 2009 to 2013, Wieczorek-Zeul served on the Bundestag’s Committee on Foreign Affairs and as spokesperson of the SPD parliamentary group on the Subcommittee on the United Nations, International Organizations and Globalization.

=== Federal Minister of Economic Cooperation and Development (1998–2009) ===
==== First term ====
When Gerhard Schröder (SPD) became Chancellor following the 1998 elections, Wieczorek-Zeul was appointed Minister for Economic Cooperation and Development. At the time, her appointment was seen as underlining the importance attached to the issue by the Social Democrat/Green government.

In her capacity as minister, Wieczorek-Zeul served as Member of the Broadcasting Board of Deutsche Welle; as Member of Board of Supervisory Directors of KfW; and as Member of the Board of Governors of the World Bank. She also participated in the preparations for the 25th G8 summit in 1999 and the 33rd G8 summit in 2007, both of which were hosted by Germany. In her first years in office, she worked merged the 'Deutsche Stiftung für internationale Entwicklung (DSE)' and the 'Carl-Duisberg-Gesellschaft (CDG)' to create InWEnt, an institution with worldwide operations in the field of bilateral development cooperation and international cooperation, with a focus on capacity building.

During a meeting at Utstein Abbey on the west coast of Norway in 1999, Wieczorek-Zeul co-founded (along with fellow development ministers Eveline Herfkens, Clare Short and Hilde Frafjord Johnson) the Utstein Group, a partnership of donor countries working to make the UN development system more effective.

In an effort to make it easier for antiwar critics to back Schröder’s decision to send German Bundeswehr troops to Afghanistan in 2001, Wieczorek-Zeul and Foreign Minister Joschka Fischer announced a 256 million marks ($115 million) humanitarian-aid package for Afghan refugees. In October 2001, she joined Schröder on a state visit to Pakistan for meetings with President Pervez Musharraf, where they revived economic assistance to the country in return for its support for the U.S.-led campaign against terrorism and in light of incoming refugee flows from Afghanistan. In 2004, she co-hosted an international donors' conference on Afghanistan in Berlin, during which Afghanistan received more than $8 billion in pledges for the years 2005 to 2007. By 2007, she called extension for the international armed forces in the country.

In February 2003, Wieczorek-Zeul was one out of three cabinet members taking part in a march against the Iraq War in Berlin.

On 16 August 2004, at the 100th anniversary of the start of the Herero and Namaqua Genocide, Wieczorek-Zeul, on behalf of the German government, officially apologized for the first time and expressed grief about the genocide, declaring, "We Germans accept our historic and moral responsibility and the guilt incurred by Germans at that time." In addition, she admitted that the massacres were equivalent to genocide. She ruled out paying special compensation, but promised continued economic aid for Namibia. Wieczorek-Zeul represented the German government at the funeral services for former Prime Minister of Japan Keizō Obuchi on 8 June 2000 and (alongside Foreign Minister Joschka Fischer) for Prime Minister of Serbia Zoran Đinđić on 16 March 2003.

==== Second term ====
Wieczorek-Zeul kept her office after Schröder's defeat in the 2005 elections and served in the first government Chancellor Angela Merkel from 2005 until 2009.

Wieczorek-Zeul initiated the EU's target of increasing its official development assistance (ODA) from 0.51 percent by 2010 to 0.7 percent of the GDP by 2015. During her time in office, German ODA increased regularly and reached 13.9 billion US$ in disbursements in 2008, taking it to 0.38 percent of GNI.

In October 2007, Wieczorek-Zeul joined Merkel on her first official trip to Africa – including stops in Ethiopia, Liberia and South Africa –, during which they met with Nelson Mandela and Graça Machel, John Kufuor and Ellen Johnson-Sirleaf, among others. She also visited Kenya's sprawling slum at Mathare 4A, Kasarani District and virtually pitied Mathare 4A primary school, which had been invaded and harassed by squatters. Today, the old school has been replaced by a new Heidemarie (formally, Mathare 4A) Primary School, courtesy of the German Government through KfW Entwicklungsbank and the government of Kenya.

On 26 January 2009, Wieczorek-Zeul and Environment Minister Sigmar Gabriel chaired the conference which led to the founding of the International Renewable Energy Agency (IRENA).

Under her leadership, Germany joined Austria and Switzerland in July 2009 in canceling €450 million ($630 million) in state export-loan guarantees for Turkey’s Ilısu Dam because Turkish plans to resettle towns and safeguard cultural treasures were not sufficient to meet World Bank standards.

Wieczorek-Zeul also served on the Executive Board of the Socialist International (SI).

==== Role in international organizations ====
After Merkel formally launched the World Bank Group’s three-year Gender Action Plan in February 2007, Wieczorek-Zeul served as honorary co-chair (alongside Danny Leipziger) of the High Level Advisory Council on Women's Economic Empowerment and as Official Champion of the World Bank Group Gender Action Plan. Amid a 2007 leadership crisis at the Bank, Wieczorek-Zeul was a leading figure in the downfall of Paul Wolfowitz as president of the organization. At the time, Germany’s role was central partly because it held the EU presidency and also chaired the bank’s 24-nation Executive Board. Wolfowitz was later replaced by Robert Zoellick.

Alongside Chancellor Merkel, Wieczorek-Zeul co-hosted the Global Fund to Fight AIDS, Tuberculosis and Malaria replenishment conference in Berlin in September 2007. During the conference, donor countries promised nearly $10 billion to the Fund for 2008–2010.

In 2008, Wieczorek-Zeul served as Special Envoy of the UN Secretary-General Ban Ki-moon for the International Conference on Financing for Development in Doha, Qatar. Between 2008 and 2009, she was part of a High-Level Taskforce on Innovative International Financing for Health Systems, which had been launched to help strengthen health systems in the 49 poorest countries in the world and was chaired by UK Prime Minister Gordon Brown and Robert Zoellick.

Also between 2008 and 2009, Wieczorek-Zeul served as member of the Commission of Experts of the President of the UN General Assembly on Reforms of the International Monetary and Financial System, which was chaired by author and Nobel Laureate economist Joseph E. Stiglitz. The commission had the aim of proposing necessary reforms in the world financial system that would prevent another event like the 2008 financial crisis.

== Life after politics ==
Since leaving politics, Wieczorek-Zeul has been involved in a number of philanthropic activities, including the following:

- German Council for Sustainable Development (RNE), Member (since 2016, appointed ad personam by Chancellor Angela Merkel)
- Kofi Annan Foundation, Member of the Electoral Integrity Initiative (EII) (since 2016)
- Global Polio Eradication Initiative (GPEI), Member of the Polio Transition Independent Monitoring Board (TIMB) (since 2016)
- Friends of the Global Fund, Vice-Chair of the Board (since 2013)
- International Partnership for Microbicides (IPM), Member of the Board of Directors (since 2014)
- Christian Liebig Foundation, Member of the Board of Trustees (since 2010)
- Africa Action, Patron (since 2009)
- CARE Deutschland-Luxemburg, Member of the Board of Trustees
- Protestant Church in Germany (Evangelische Kirche in Deutschland, EKD), Member of the Committee on Sustainable Development
- Friedrich Ebert Foundation (FES), Member
- Health Impact Fund (HIF), Member of the Advisory Board
- Neue Gesellschaft/Frankfurter Hefte, Member of the Advisory Board
- United Nations Association of Germany (DGVN), Member of the Presidium
- Xertifix, Member of the Board of Trustees
- Wilhelm Dröscher Prize of the Social Democratic Party, Member of the Board of Trustees
- Humanist Union (HU), Member of the Advisory Board (until 2012)
- KfW, Ex-Officio Member of the Board of Supervisory Directors (1998–2009)

== Political positions ==
=== Global health ===
In 2001, Wieczorek-Zeul called for 39 pharmaceutical firms – including GlaxoSmithKline, Merck, Bristol-Myers Squibb, Roche, and Boehringer Ingelheim – to abandon their legal challenge to a South African law designed to lower the price of patent-protected HIV and AIDS medicines.

In March 2009, Wieczorek-Zeul criticized statements made by Pope Benedict XVI which claimed that condoms promote AIDS. when in fact they help prevent AIDS. In a joint statement with Health Minister Ulla Schmidt, she criticized the pope's remarks and underlined the importance of condom use in developing nations.

In September 2009, Wieczorek-Zeul announced the German government’s pledge of an additional $130 million (€100 million) to the Global Polio Eradication Initiative (GPEI) for 2009 to 2013.

=== Relations with Israel ===
In 2006, Wieczorek-Zeul voiced criticism against Israel's attacks on civilian infrastructure in Lebanon during the 2006 Lebanon War, calling it "completely unacceptable." In response, Charlotte Knobloch, head of the Central Council of Jews in Germany, demanded her resignation.

=== Relations with Tibet ===
In May 2008, Wieczorek-Zeul was the only minister of Chancellor Merkel’s government who agreed to meet with the Dalai Lama, the spiritual leader of Tibet, during a five-day visit to Germany. This was against the wishes of Foreign Minister Frank-Walter Steinmeier and the leader of the Social Democrats, Kurt Beck, who had both said that no senior party leaders would meet with him. The visit took place eight months after a historic meeting between the Dalai Lama and Merkel caused a deep diplomatic rift between China and Germany.

== Recognition ==
- 1996 – Decoration of Honour for Services to the Republic of Austria
- 2001 – Polio Eradication Champion Award of Rotary International
- 2003 – Commitment to Development Award (jointly with the other three original members of the Utstein Group: Eveline Herfkens, Clare Short, and Hilde Frafjord Johnson)
- 2005 – Peter Beier Prize of the Evangelical Church in the Rhineland
- 2007 – Silver Rose Award of Solidar
- 2011 – Holger Börner Medal

== Controversy ==
In 2007, Wieczorek-Zeul caused controversy by visiting President Bashar al-Assad of Syria in Damascus and promising €34 million in aid to the country. During her visit, she noted that Germany supported Syria's bid to sign a partnership agreement with the European Union.
