= Freefall: America, Free Markets, and the Sinking of the World Economy =

2010 non-fiction book

- First edition cover
- Author: Joseph Stiglitz
- Language: English
- Genre: Non-fiction
- Publisher: W. W. Norton & Company
- Publication date: January 19, 2010
- Publication place: United States
- Media type: Print, e-book
- Pages: 361 pp.
- ISBN: 978-0393075960
- OCLC: 317919706
- LC Class: HB3722 .S842 2010b

Freefall: America, Free Markets, and the Sinking of the World Economy is a book on the causes and consequences of the Great Recession by economist and Nobel laureate Joseph E. Stiglitz, first published in 2010 by W. W. Norton & Company. While focusing on the roots of the 2008 financial crisis and the subsequent global economic slowdown, which he claims to find mainly in fiscal policy as conducted during the Bush presidency and decisions made by the Federal Reserve, Stiglitz also talks about the failure to cope with the recession during the months succeeding the Wall Street Crash of 2008. Finally, he sketches various schemes as to the possible future of the American economy, vigorously proposing a profound policy shift. In compliance with Stiglitz's general attitude towards economic policy, Freefall contains "proposals to tame the banking sector and to foster a more humanistic style of capitalism in the United States and abroad." According to an assessment written by Larry Elliott for The Guardian, the book "reeks of 'I told you so'." because during the years preceding the crisis, Stiglitz had "warned policy makers repeatedly that the United States was headed toward a deep, painful recession if pre-emptive interventions were not made."

== Title ==
The title of the book points at the sharp decline in stock prices following the bankruptcy of the investment bank Lehman Brothers in September, 2008. Meanwhile, its subtitle reveals Stiglitz's conviction that free markets are at the bottom of the crisis, as he makes deregulation responsible for the rise of the shadow banking system, over-leveraged banks and subprime mortgages. Accordingly, in Freefall Stiglitz criticizes advocates of deregulation and free markets, most notoriously Larry Summers and Ben Bernanke.

== Contents ==
The book which is "rife with (...) indignation" consists of ten chapters, some of which analyze the causes of the Great Recession while others cover the subsequent – and, as per Stiglitz, flawed – crisis management. Still others look ahead and serve the purpose of explaining Stiglitz's proposal for "a reassessment of the sort of economy in which financiers enriched themselves by selling over-priced and risky products to some of the most vulnerable citizens in America."

Stiglitz grants a large share of the blame for the Great Recession to George W. Bush and his far-reaching tax cuts for wealthy Americans. He also attacks Bush's successor Barack Obama for practically continuing with that fiscal policy. According to Stiglitz, Obama's decision to stick with both Ben Bernanke and Larry Summers, is sufficient proof for the president's refusal to alter the course. However, not all of Stiglitz's criticism is aimed at the White House, as he also attacks the Federal Reserve under the leadership of first Alan Greenspan and then Ben Bernanke. Moreover, he mentions the danger of economic interconnectedness and globalization, stating that by "purchasing enormous amounts of U.S. debt in the form of T-bills and treasury issuances, the Chinese have helped to maintain artificially low interest rates and the accompanying American debt-driven consumption patterns."

=== Deregulation ===
Common thread of Freefall is Stiglitz's conviction that deregulation and the subsequent lack of transparency in the financial sector are responsible for the severity of the Great Recession. He consequently considers regulation a requirement for solid recovery and expressed concern regarding economic policy as performed during Barack Obama's first months as president in an interview with The New York Times:

"At the time Obama appointed his economics team, he was focused on getting a team that he thought would have the confidence of the financial markets, a team that the bankers liked. (...) As an example, back in the spring of 2008, people like Bernanke were saying we’re over the worst. Regulators didn’t want to admit that they had made really bad regulatory decisions. They didn’t want to admit that they had allowed a housing bubble to grow. (...) Over the last year, there has been a drumbeat that has increased as Congress has failed to enact adequate regulations. (...) The basic thing about somebody like Paul [Volcker] is he’s not looking for another career. He tells things as they are. He is the one who said that if banks are too big to fail, then they’re too big to be managed, they’re too complex, there is no person who can really manage anything of that complexity."

Thus Freefall also promotes to undo the 1999 repeal of the regulative Glass-Steagall Act, with Stiglitz depicting it as necessary in order to eradicate the contamination of the banking sector:

"Given what the economy has been through, it is clear that the federal government should reinstitute some revised version of the Glass-Steagall Act. There is no choice: any institution that has the benefits of a commercial bank – including the government's safety nets – has to be severely restricted in its ability to take on risk. (...) There are simply too many conflicts of interest and too many problems to allow commingling of the activities of commercial and investment banks. The promised benefits of the repeal of Glass-Steagall proved illusory and the costs proved greater than even critics of the repeal imagined. The problems are especially acute with the too-big-to-fail banks. (...) The imperative of reinstating the Glass-Steagall Act quickly is suggested by recent behaviour of some investment banks, for whom trading has once again proved to be a major source of profits."

=== Incentives ===
A central theme of Freefall is the notion of incentives and the distorted incentive structures that allowed the 2008 financial crisis to happen. In the first chapter, Stiglitz mentions that on one hand:"One of the arguments put forward by many in the financial markets for not helping mortgage owners is that (...) incentives to repay are weakened if mortgage owners know that there is some chance they will be helped out if they don't repay". While on the other hand:"When it came to America's big banks (...) concerns about moral hazard were shunted aside, so much so as the bank officers were allowed to enjoy huge bonuses for record losses". Then, throughout his book, Stiglitz explains how almost every decision maker in the financial system had incentives to create a housing bubble, record high profits and pass on the risk to others as externalities.

"Before the arrival of modern innovations in finance (...) banks held on to the loans they originated, they had [incentives] to be careful." But Stiglitz shows that with deregulation and the arrival of modern financial innovations, it turned out otherwise. With the securitization process, banks had incentives to make as much bad mortgages as possible. Those bad mortgages were "repackaged and (..) passed on to investors, including pension funds." With this process, it didn't matter anymore to the banks that the home owners would go bankrupt because the loss would be passed on to investors and ordinary citizens (through pension funds). Another key element in this system was the credit rating agencies. In fact, "to buy the [bad mortgages], managers of pension funds had to be sure (...) they were safe." To make sure that these mortgages would be bought by pension funds, banks were paying the rating agencies to get AAA ratings. Thus, "like everyone else in the sector, [rating agencies's] incentives were distorted. (...) They were being paid by the banks that originated the securities they were asked to rate".

== Critical reception ==
Freefall was generally well received by critics, although some expressed doubts as to the feasibility of Stiglitz's proposals for change.

The New York Times, for instance, stated that the contents of Freefall: "may all be worthy ideas. But [that] at times, Mr. Stiglitz’s call for a new economic order seems a bit fanciful." In an earlier review, Michiko Kakutani went even further, criticizing that his: "remarks not only give ammunition to conservative critics who want to dismiss Mr. Stiglitz as a European-style liberal, but [that] they also have the unfortunate effect of diverting the reader’s attention from the many shrewd assessments that he makes in Freefall about the causes and consequences of the great financial meltdown of 2008."

In a review run by The Observer, economist Will Hutton expressed more optimism, claiming: "[i]t requires bravery to take on the vested interests – along with good ideas and a strong sense of the right trajectory. At present we have too little of any of them. Stiglitz's book successfully redresses the balance. It is very welcome – and important."

The New Statesman rather focused on shortcomings of Freefall: "In an impressive final chapter, Stiglitz takes apart the theorists of market fundamentalism – for their abstractness, their failure to see where economics should stop and sociology begin. But his own economics seem shorn of a social and political dimension: whether you choose Foucault, Marx or C. Wright Mills, if you are a critic of the capitalist system you must have some explanation of why it goes on producing power elites who stand in the way of attempts to control it. This is the crucial element missing from Stiglitz's analytical framework."

The French economist Guy Sorman, author of the libertarian book Economics Does Not Lie, showed himself sceptical about Freefall, stating that its author: "feels compelled to remind the reader that he is not a socialist: he only advocates a better world. His utopia would replace the failed market fundamentalism by striking the right balance between market and state. (...) Stiglitz’s Nobel Prize on market asymmetry was well deserved. His opinions on everything else are just opinions and deserve to be treated as such."

The Economist juxtaposed Freefall in opposition to 13 Bankers, a slightly later published book with similar contents by Simon Johnson and James Kwak. Neither of the books was given a positive assessment, with Freefall being criticized for argumentative inconsistency: "If policymakers failed as miserably as Mr Stiglitz believes, then he ought to be far more worried about the potential for government failure in the future. That dissonance is a glaring weakness in Mr Stiglitz's book."

== See also ==
- Post-war displacement of Keynesianism
- 2008–09 Keynesian resurgence
- Comparisons between the Great Recession and the Great Depression
