= Stiglitz Report =

Book by Joseph Stiglitz

- Author: Joseph Stiglitz
- Publication date: 2010
- ISBN: 978-1595585202

The Stiglitz Report: Reforming the International Monetary and Financial Systems in the Wake of the Global Crisis is a book documenting the necessary changes and reforms of the international financial institutions during the 2008 financial crisis and the Great Recession. Written by a commission chaired by Nobel laureate economist Joseph Stiglitz, the report frames the crisis as part of a series of simultaneous crises, those of energy crisis, food crisis, water scarcity, and sustainability. It goes through four main topics:

1. Macroeconomic issues and perspectives
2. Reforming global regulation to enhance global economic stability
3. International institutions
4. International financial innovations

The concluding comments of the report blame flawed policies as well as unsound economic philosophies for the crisis. The report advocates for the global community to "work for a robust and sustainable recovery" and for changes that support "long-term, democratic, equitable, stable, and sustainable growth".

[…] underlying many of these mistakes, in both the public and private sectors, were the economic philosophies that have prevailed for the past quarter century (sometimes referred to as neoliberalism or market fundamentalism). These flawed theories distorted decisions in both the private and public sector, leading to the policies that contributed so much to the crisis and to the notion, for instance, that markets are self-correcting and that regulation is accordingly unnecessary. These theories also contributed to flawed policies on the part of Central Banks.

— Stiglitz Report, chapter 6, paragraph 3.

In the 2010s, the World Council of Churches and other Christian ecumenical bodies issued the São Paulo Statement and associated documents calling for further work to “carry forward the valuable work of the Stiglitz Commission”.

== Commission of Experts on Reforms of the International Monetary and Financial System ==
In October 2008, the President of the United Nations General Assembly Miguel d'Escoto Brockmann established the Commission of Experts on Reforms of the International Monetary and Financial System chaired by Stiglitz "to review the workings of the global financial system, including major bodies such as the World Bank and the IMF, and to suggest steps to be taken by Member States to secure a more sustainable and just global economic order". The commission had the aim of proposing necessary reforms in the world financial system that would prevent another event like the 2008 financial crisis.

Besides Stiglitz, members of the commission included Andrei Bougrov, Youssef Boutros-Ghali, Jean-Paul Fitoussi, Charles Goodhart, Robert Johnson, Jomo Kwame Sundaram, Benno Ndulu, José Antonio Ocampo, Pedro Páez, Avinash Persaud, Yaga Venugopal Reddy, Rubens Ricupero, Eisuke Sakakibara, Chukwuma Soludo, Heidemarie Wieczorek-Zeul, Yu Yongding and Zeti Akhtar Aziz. Jan Kregel acted as rapporteur. The commission presented its recommendations on 20 March 2009 and a preliminary draft of its full report on 21 May 2009. The final report was released 21 September 2009.

== See also ==
- New International Economic Order
