= Commission on the Measurement of Economic Performance and Social Progress =

The Commission on the Measurement of Economic Performance and Social Progress (CMEPSP), generally referred to as the Stiglitz–Sen–Fitoussi Commission after the surnames of its leaders, is a commission of inquiry created by the French Government in 2008. The inquiry examined how the wealth and social progress of a nation could be measured, without relying on the uni-dimensional gross domestic product (GDP) measure. The Commission was formed in February 2008 and Joseph E. Stiglitz was named as the Chair. Amartya Sen was the Economic Adviser and the French economist Jean-Paul Fitoussi was the Coordinator. The Final Report was published in September 2009. An additional contribution from the aforementioned three main organizers which specifically addresses the Financial Crisis (as of 2007) is also available.
