= Yu Yongding =

Chinese economist

- 余永定
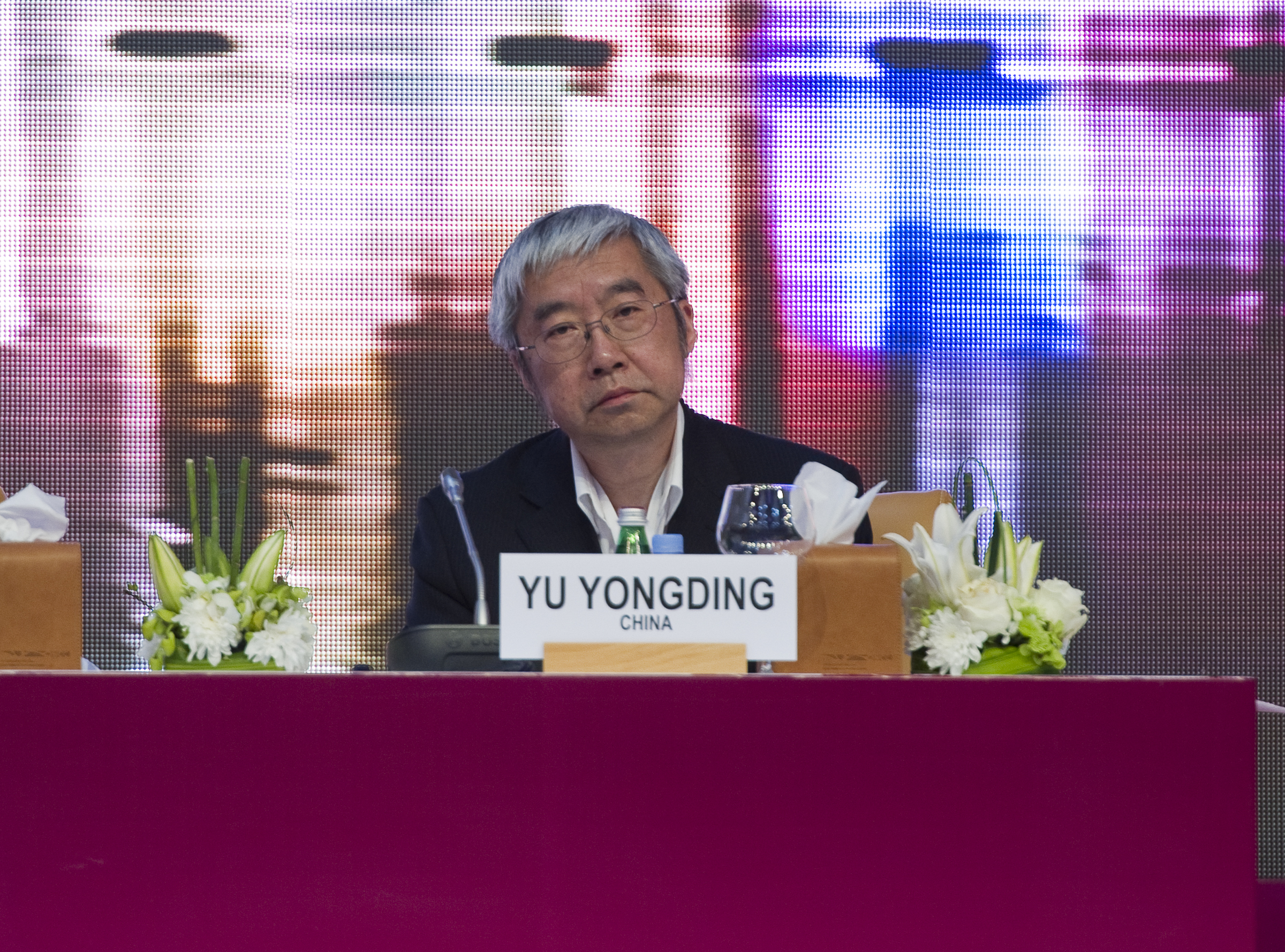
- Yu at an UNCTAD conference in 2012
- Born: November 1948 (age 77); Nanjing
- Citizenship: Chinese
- Known for: Macroeconomic research and policy advice

Yu Yongding (余永定) is a Chinese economist, with widely recognized influence in Chinese economic policy debates.

== Biography and career ==
Yu was born in Nanjing in November 1948 in a family with ancestry from Taishan, Guangdong. He graduated from Beijing Steel and Iron Institute in 1969, received an MA in economics from the Graduate School of Chinese Academy of Social Sciences in 1983, and a D.Phil. in economics from Oxford in 1994.

As a young man, Yu's education was interrupted by the Cultural Revolution. He worked at Beijing Heavy Machinery Factory (北京第二通用机械厂) from 1969 to 1979. In 1979 he joined the Institute for World Economics and Politics (IWEP) at the Chinese Academy of Social Sciences (CASS) where he worked for three decades; he remains an Academician of CASS. At IWEP he was a Junior Fellow (1979–1983), Research Fellow (1983–1987), and Senior Research Fellow (from 1987); head of the Department of Western Economic Theory from 1986 to 1988; and the institute's Director from 1998 to 2009.

From 2003 to 2011 he was President of the China Society of World Economy and Editor-in-Chief of the journal China and World Economy. He has also been Editor-in-Chief of The World Economy and of the International Review of Economics. He is the winner of the 2000–2005 Sun Yefang Prize in Economics. From 2004 to 2006, he served on the Monetary Policy Committee of the People's Bank of China.

He has also been a member of the Advisory Committee on National Planning of the National Development and Reform Commission (2005–2010), of the Advisory Committee on Foreign Policy of the Ministry of Foreign Affairs, and of the Foreign Affairs Committee of the Chinese People's Political Consultative Conference.

Yu served on United Nations bodies and International Monetary Fund bodies, including the UN Commission of Experts on Reforms of the International Monetary and Financial System, and the UN Committee for Development Policy, among others. He has also been a member of the Council on Global Governance of the World Economic Forum and of the Advisory Committee and Global Commission of the Institute for New Economic Thinking, and an advisor of the China Finance 40 Forum.

== Policy advice ==
Yu Yongding has long been involved and influential in Chinese and international monetary, fiscal and macroeconomic policy debates.

Yu has favored China's adjustment of overseas assets and liabilities, as well as the strengthening of capital controls, to improve the security and performance of China's overseas assets. Yu views China's large holdings of US treasuries as a "grotesque misallocation of resources" given that their real net investment income to China has been negative for almost two decades. Yu also notes that the dollar is depreciating in real terms because of the US's rising national debt and the US Federal Reserve's expansionary monetary policy. Yu's view is that the US has already "stopped playing by the monetary rules." Accordingly, Yu favors moving China's foreign exchange reserves away from dollar-denominated assets and instead invest increasingly in raw energy and materials.

Yu supports China's economic strategy of dual circulation. In Yu's view, the initial reason to develop dual circulation was for economic benefit. Following United States President Donald Trump's emphasis on decoupling the U.S. from China and the U.S. government placing Chinese companies on its entities list, Yu's view is that dual circulation has now also become a matter of security for China. To counter U.S. efforts to decouple, Yu advocates policy he describes using the metaphors of "spare wheels" and "body-lock" (the latter metaphor drawn from the sport of wrestling). "Spare wheels" can include a variety of policy measures, such as providing support to China's high-tech national champions or long-term efforts to encourage the development of domestic engineering talent. The "body-lock" involves China opposing efforts to isolate or sanction it by actively building links in other countries, including with U.S. business, in the hope that these cooperative activities will develop constituencies opposed to isolating China.

== Selected publications ==
- Western Economic Theory, Textbook for the Graduate School of Chinese Academy of Social Sciences (中国社会科学院研究生院教材·西方经济学, 2003)
- Wither RMB: Current Problems and Future Adjustment (人民币悬念:人民币汇率的当前处境和未来改革, 2003), co-authored with He Fan
- Observations on the World Economy (我看世界经济, 2004)
- Economic Globalisation and Development Trends for the International Economy (经济全球化与世界经济发展趋势, 2002), co-authored with Li Xiangyang
- The Thought Trajectory of an Academic (一个学者的思想轨迹, 2005)
- Summertime for the Chinese Economy (中国经济的夏天, 2005), co-authored with He Fan
- Globalisation and China: Theory and Development Trends (全球化与中国：理论与发展趋势, 2010), co-authored with Gao Haihong and Lu Aiguo
- Testament to Imbalances (见证失衡, 2010)
- China’s Sustainable Development: Challenges and Future (中国的可持续发展：挑战与未来, 2011)
- The Last Bottleneck: the debate between Capital Account liberalisation and Renminbi Internationalisation (最后的屏障, 2016)
- Studies on China’s Macro Controls and Regulations (九十年代以来中国宏观调控研究余永定, 2019)
- There is Nothing New Under The Sun (太阳之下无新事, 2020)
