= Andrew Weiss (economist) =

American economist (born 1947)

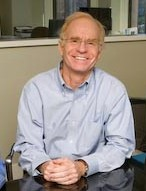
- Born: New York City, New York, U.S.
- Education: Williams College (BA); Stanford University (MA, PhD)
- Spouse: Bonnie Weiss

Andrew M. Weiss is founder and chief executive officer of Weiss Asset Management, a Boston-based investment firm, and professor emeritus Boston University.

== Early years and education ==
Weiss was born in New York in 1947. He graduated with Honors from Williams College in 1968 with a BA in Political Economy. In 1977, he received his PhD in economics from Stanford University.

== Academic career ==
Weiss began his career in 1976 as an assistant professor at Columbia University, as well as a Research Economist in the Mathematics Center at Bell Laboratories. He has served as a consultant to the World Bank and the United States National Research Council, the research arm of the United States National Academy of Sciences. In 1989, Weiss was elected a Fellow of the Econometric Society. Weiss is the author of 49 published papers and the book Efficiency Wages: Models of Unemployment, Layoffs and Wage Dispersion. The Nobel Prize in Economics awarded to Joseph Stiglitz in 2001 cited Weiss' research with Stiglitz as having had "a substantial impact in the domains of corporate finance, monetary theory and macroeconomics." As of June 2025, Weiss was ranked in the top one percent of published economists by the number of citations to his papers. Weiss has articles published in top economic journals such as The Journal of Political Economy, The American Economic Review, The Quarterly Journal of Economics, and The Review of Economic Studies.

== Professional career ==
Andrew Weiss is the Founder and chief executive officer of Weiss Asset Management, a Boston-based investment firm. Weiss and the investment strategies of Weiss Asset Management have been the subject of numerous U.S. and European newspaper and magazine articles, including features in Forbes, Outstanding Investor Digest, Micropal, and The Motley Fool. Weiss Asset Management reports to have over 100 employees and manage approximately $4.0 billion of assets.

=== In the Press ===
During a CNBC program, Michael Metz, the Chief Investment Strategist for Oppenheimer Holdings, proclaimed Weiss to be "one of the most brilliant money managers that I know." Bruce Greenwald, the Robert Heilbrunn Professor of Finance and Asset Management at Columbia University and author of Value Investing, said of Weiss in an interview with The Motley Fool, "If I had one person to pick and one guy to put the money in, I would pick him." Robert Solow, a Nobel Prize Laureate in Economics and an Institute Professor at MIT, said at a press conference on March 15, 2005 "[Weiss] is a significant person among US economists. I have known him personally for 30 years and I have the highest respect for him." Laurence Kotlikoff, Professor of Economics at Boston University, was quoted in The Boston Globe article Nightmare in Prague as saying Weiss is "a brilliant economist, and he’s an outstanding investor. He's scrupulously honest, and I'd trust him with anything".

== Other Involvements ==
In addition to his professional and academic activities, Weiss currently serves on the advisory board for the University of Global Health Equity in Rwanda, The Center for Effective Global Action (at UC Berkeley), Last Mile Health, and the UBS Optimus Foundation. He is a senior fellow at the Niskanen Center and is a member of the Council on Foreign Relations. He is also a co-founder of CRI Foundation, Inc. (f/k/a Child Relief International) and a former board member of the American Jewish World Service. The three 2019 Economics Nobel Laureates donated their prize money to the Weiss Fund for Research in Development Economics.

== Personal life ==
Weiss lives in Boston, Massachusetts with his wife Bonnie.
