= Whither Socialism? =

Book by Joseph Eugene Stiglitz

- Title page for Whither Socialism? (1994)
- Author: Joseph Stiglitz
- Genre: Economics
- Publisher: MIT Press
- Publication date: 1994

Whither Socialism? is a book on economics by Joseph Stiglitz, first published in 1994 by MIT Press.

== Description ==
Whither Socialism? is based on Stiglitz's Wicksell Lectures, presented at the Stockholm School of Economics in 1990 and presents a summary of the central themes of information economics and serves as a primer on the theory of markets with imperfect information and imperfect competition as well as being a critique of both free market and market socialist approaches (see Roemer critique, op. cit.). Stiglitz explains how the neoclassical, or Walrasian model ("Walrasian economics" refers to the result of the process which has given birth to a formal representation of Smith's notion of the invisible hand, along the lines put forward by Walras and encapsulated in the general equilibrium model of Arrow–Debreu), which has dominated economic thought over the past half century, may have wrongly encouraged the belief that market socialism could work. Stiglitz proposes an alternative model, based on the information economics established by the Greenwald–Stiglitz theorems, that aims to provide greater theoretical insight into the workings of a market economy and offer clearer guidance for the setting of policy in transitional economies.

One of the reasons Stiglitz sees for the critical failing in the standard neoclassical model, on which market socialism was built, is its assumptions concerning information, particularly its failure to consider the problems that arise from lack of perfect information and from the costs of acquiring information. He also identifies problems arising from its assumptions concerning completeness.

== Critique ==
Whither Socialism? has been subject to various critiques such as those of the Yale professor John Roemer (An Anti-Hayekian Manifesto – 1995), the one written by Peter Boettke, the Deputy Director of the James M. Buchanan Center for Political Economy (1996), as well as the critique by David L. Prychitko, a professor of economics at Northern Michigan University, which was published in The Cato Journal (fall 1996). Prychitko says that "the book hopes to go beyond the confines of pure technical economic theory, as its title implies. Stiglitz makes efforts to join the dialogue in political economy, and wonders "whether the insights of modern economic theory and the utopian ideals of the nineteenth century can be brought closer together?" (p. 277). It is precisely this comment that invites criticism, not so much because he wants to save some socialist ideals (however, through a "people's capitalism" [p. 265]), but rather because of his unexamined presuppositions regarding how to do so." "Stiglitz insists that we should not ask whether or not the state has a role to play in the economy, but rather how large a role, and in what specific tasks (p. 231). For Stiglitz, the problem is posed correctly only when we seek an "appropriate balance between markets and government" (p. 267)", but he fails to indicate what an "appropriate balance" would be. "Stiglitz formally demonstrates the potential efficiency-enhancing properties of the state based on the Greenwald–Stiglitz theorems (establishing the – constrained – Pareto inefficiency of market economies with imperfect information and incomplete markets), and "believes that solutions to worldly problems can become illuminated by this new set of mathematical theorems, to replace the old theorems of Arrow–Debreu and Lange–Lerner (pp. 4–6, 231–32)."

Stiglitz mentions that economics must be recast as something more than a constrained maximization problem, and proposes his own alternative – a mathematical theorem that encompasses more complex, nonlinear vectors.

According to Prychitko: "Finally, if Stiglitz's main insight is generally correct – that the state cannot be ruled out or that it should be ruled in – but leaves open the grand constitutional questions: How will the coercive institutions of the state be constrained? What is the relation between the state and civil society? His book fails on these political aspects because it has not addressed the broader constitutional concerns that James M. Buchanan (1975) and other economists have raised."

== See also ==
- History of economic thought
