= David Newbery =

British economist

David Newbery CBE
- Born: 1 June 1943 (age 83)

Academic background
- Education: University of Cambridge

Academic work
- Doctoral students: Rufus Pollock
- Website: Information at IDEAS / RePEc

David Michael Garrood Newbery, CBE, FBA (born 1 June 1943), is a British economist who has been Professor of Applied Economics at the University of Cambridge since 1988. He specialises in the field of energy economics, and he writes on the regulation of electricity markets. His interests also include climate change mitigation and environmental policy, privatisation, and risk.

== Early life ==
Newbery was born on 1 June 1943 at Fulmer Chase, Fulmer, Buckinghamshire. He studied at Portsmouth Grammar School from 1954 till 1961, where he won Best Science Candidate in Cambridge GCE A&S Level. He read Mathematics and Economics at Trinity College, Cambridge, obtaining a B.A. in 1964, M.A. (Cantab.) in 1968 and a Ph.D. degree in 1976.

== Career ==
In 1965 he was pre-elected to a Churchill Teaching Fellowship. In 1966 he gained the position of University Assistant Lecturer at the Faculty of Economics. He was the Director of the Department of Applied Economics from 1988 until 2003. He also served as a Professor II at Tromso University, Norway from 2011 until 2013.

In 1981 Newbery co-authored a book (The Theory of Commodity Price Stabilization: A Study in the Economics of Risk) and several articles with the Nobel-laureate Joseph Stiglitz.

Besides his role as Professor of Applied Economics at Cambridge, he serves as Vice-Chairman of Cambridge Economic Policy Associates, Director of the Cambridge Electricity Policy Research Group and an occasional consultant to the World Bank. He was a member of the Competition Commission in 1996–2002, and chairman of the Dutch electricity market surveillance committee. He was elected a Fellow of the British Academy in 1991. He is a member of the Academic Panel of DEFRA. Since 1966 he has been a fellow of Churchill College, and was President of its Senior Combination Room (SCR) in from 2010 to 2019.

== Honours ==
- Newbery was appointed Commander of the Order of the British Empire (CBE) in the 2012 Birthday Honours for services to economics.
- He was awarded an Honorary Doctorate by the Paris Dauphine University in 2022
- He was elected Fellow of Econometric Society in 1989.
- He was awarded Frisch Medal of the Econometric Society in 1990.
- He was awarded Harry Johnson Prize by Canadian Economics Association in 1993.
- He received the IAEE 2002 Outstanding Contributions to the Profession of Energy Economics Award.
- He was awarded an Honorary Degree at the University of Antwerp in 2004.
- He was president of International Association of Energy Economics in 2013.

== Selected bibliography ==
=== Books ===
- Newbery, David M.G.; Stiglitz, Joseph E. (1981). The theory of commodity price stabilization: a study in the economics of risk. Oxford Oxford New York: Clarendon Press Oxford University Press. ISBN 9780198284178.
- Newbery, David M.G.; Stern, Nicholas (1987). The Theory of taxation for developing countries. New York: Published for the World Bank by Oxford University Press. ISBN 9780195205411.
- Newbery, David M.G. (1995). Tax and benefit reform in Central and Eastern Europe. London: Centre for Economic Policy Research. ISBN 9781898128199.
- Newbery, David M. (1999). Privatization, restructuring, and regulation of network utilities. The Walras-Pareto Lectures. Cambridge, Massachusetts: MIT Press.
- Newbery, David M. (2003). The distributional impact of the proposed tax reform on Greek households.
- Newbery, David M.G.; Székely, István P. (2008). Hungary: an economy in transition. Cambridge: Cambridge University Press. ISBN 9780521057547.

=== Journal articles ===
- Newbery, David M.G. (September 1970). "A theorem on the measurement of inequality". Journal of Economic Theory. 2 (3): 264–266. doi:10.1016/0022-0531(70)90040-2.
- Newbery, David M.G. (Spring 1978). "Stochastic limit pricing". The Bell Journal of Economics. 9 (1): 260–269. doi:10.2307/3003625. JSTOR 3003625.
- Newbery, David M.G.; Stiglitz, Joseph E. (December 1979). "The theory of commodity price stabilisation rules: welfare impacts and supply responses". The Economic Journal. 89 (356): 799–817. doi:10.2307/2231500. JSTOR 2231500.
- Newbery, David M.G.; Stiglitz, Joseph E. (January 1984). "Pareto inferior trade". Review of Economic Studies. 51 (1): 1–12. doi:10.2307/2297701. JSTOR 2297701.
- Newbery, D.M. and J.E. Stiglitz (1982) ‘The Choice of Techniques and the Optimality of Market Equilibrium with Rational Expectations’, Journal of Political Economy, 90(2), April, 223-46. doi: https://www.jstor.org/stable/1830291?seq=2#references_tab_contents. JSTOR 1830291.
