= Michael Rothschild =

American economist (born 1942)

- Born: August 2, 1942 (age 83); Chicago, Illinois, U.S.

Academic background
- Education: Reed College (BA); Yale University (MA); Massachusetts Institute of Technology (PhD)
- Doctoral advisor: Franklin M. Fisher

Academic work
- Discipline: Microeconomics, public economics
- Institutions: Princeton University; University of California, Los Angeles
- Doctoral students: Oliver Hart
- Website: Information at IDEAS / RePEc

Michael Rothschild (born August 2, 1942) is an American economist. He is a professor at the University of California, Los Angeles (UCLA), and a former dean at Princeton.

== Education ==
Rothschild holds a Bachelor of Arts in anthropology from Reed College (1963), and a Master of Arts in international relations from Yale University (1965). He earned his Doctor of Philosophy in economics from the Massachusetts Institute of Technology (1969).

== Honors ==
Rothschild has achieved widespread recognition through his time in academia and beyond. He is a fellow of the American Academy of Arts and Sciences, the American Association of the Advancement of Science, and the Econometric Society.

== Academic career ==
He was the William Stuart Tod Professor of Economics and Public Affairs, emeritus at the Woodrow Wilson School of Public and International Affairs. He was dean of the Woodrow Wilson School of Public and International Affairs at Princeton University from 1995 through 2001. Rothschild has written on asymmetric information, decision-making under uncertainty, demography, investment, taxation, finance, and jury-decision processes.

He co-authored one of the most important papers in economics, Equilibrium in Competitive Insurance Markets: An Essay on the Economics of Imperfect Information, with Joseph Stiglitz. This paper gives the first systematic exposition of the problem of cherry picking when insurance companies compete for customers. In Increasing Risk I: A definition, Rothschild and Stiglitz introduced the important decision theory concept of the mean-preserving spread, which leads to a partial ordering of probability distributions according to degree of risk.

Not only has he written on insurance, but also asymmetric information, demography, investment, taxation, finance among others. In addition, he coedited Studies of Supply and Demand in Higher Education. It highlights the presence of competition, use of resources, decision-making in education regarding higher education.

Notably he wrote about decision-making under uncertainty through, Uncertainty in Economics: Readings and Exercises, with Peter Diamond. This book synthesizes the traditional and modern thought associated with economic uncertainty. It provides understanding into three primary groups: theory of choice under uncertainty, general equilibrium models of financial institutions, and models of the effects of uncertainty on market institutions.
