= Globalization and Its Discontents =

2002 non-fiction book by Joseph E. Stiglitz

- Author: Joseph E. Stiglitz
- Language: English
- Subject: Globalization
- Publisher: W.W. Norton & Company
- Publication date: June 2002
- Publication place: United States
- Media type: Print (paperback)
- ISBN: 0-393-05124-2
- OCLC: 49226144
- Dewey Decimal: 337 21
- LC Class: HF1418.5 .S75 2002

Globalization and Its Discontents is a book published in 2002 by the 2001 Nobel laureate Joseph E. Stiglitz. The title is a reference to Freud's Civilization and Its Discontents.

The book draws on Stiglitz's personal experience as chairman of the Council of Economic Advisers under Bill Clinton from 1993 and chief economist at the World Bank from 1997. During this period Stiglitz became disillusioned with the IMF and other international institutions, which he came to believe acted against the interests of impoverished developing countries. Stiglitz argues that the policies pursued by the IMF are based on neoliberal assumptions that are fundamentally unsound:

Behind the free market ideology there is a model, often attributed to Adam Smith, which argues that market forces—the profit motive—drive the economy to efficient outcomes as if by an invisible hand. One of the great achievements of modern economics is to show the sense in which, and the conditions under which, Smith's conclusion is correct. It turns out that these conditions are highly restrictive. Indeed, more recent advances in economic theory—ironically occurring precisely during the period of the most relentless pursuit of the Washington Consensus policies—have shown that whenever information is imperfect and markets incomplete, which is to say always, and especially in developing countries, then the invisible hand works most imperfectly. Significantly, there are desirable government interventions which, in principle, can improve upon the efficiency of the market. These restrictions on the conditions under which markets result in efficiency are important—many of the key activities of government can be understood as responses to the resulting market failures.

Stiglitz argues that IMF policies contributed to bringing about the 1997 Asian financial crisis, as well as the 1998–2002 Argentine great depression. Also noted was the failure of Russia's conversion to a market economy and low levels of development in Sub-Saharan Africa. Specific policies criticised by Stiglitz include fiscal austerity, high interest rates, trade liberalization, and the liberalization of capital markets and insistence on the privatization of state assets.

== Contents of the book ==
The theories which guide the IMF's policies are empirically flawed. Free market, neoclassical, and neoliberal are all essentially euphemisms for the disastrous laissez-faire economics of the late 19th century. This approach seeks to minimize the role of government—arguing that lower wages solve problems of unemployment, and relying upon trickle-down economics (the belief that growth and wealth will trickle down to all segments of society) to address poverty. Stiglitz finds no evidence to support this belief, and considers the 'Washington Consensus' policy of free markets to be a blend of ideology and bad science.

Joseph Stiglitz was awarded the 2001 Nobel Memorial Prize in Economic Sciences (shared with George Akerlof and Michael Spence) for demonstrating how information affects markets. Without equal access to information between employer and employee, company and consumer, or (in the IMF's case) lender and debtor, there is no chance of "free" markets operating efficiently. (This explanation also owes much to the earlier Nobel work of Kenneth Arrow and Gérard Debreu.)

Stiglitz explains that globalization could be either success or failure, depending on its management. There is a success when it is managed by national government by embracing their characteristics of each individual country; however, there is a failure when it is managed by international institutions such as IMF.

Globalization is beneficial under the condition that the economic management operated by national government and the example is East Asian countries. Those countries (especially South Korea and Taiwan) were based on exports through which they were able to close technological, capital and knowledge gaps. By managing national pace of change and speed of liberalization on their own, those countries were able to achieve economic growth. The countries who received the benefits from the globalization shared their profits equally.

However, Stiglitz believes that if the national economy regulated by international institutions there could be an adverse effect. It is because the international institutions such as IMF, WTO, and World Bank lack transparency and accountability. Without government oversight, they reach decisions without public debate and resolve trade disputes involving "uncompetitive" or "onerous" environmental, labor, and capital laws in secret tribunals—without appeal to a nation's courts.

In East Asia's financial crisis, Russia's failed conversion to a market economy, failed development in sub-Saharan Africa, and financial meltdown in Argentina, Stiglitz argues that IMF policies contributed to a disaster: It failed to promote productive investment opportunities and demand for credit of quality; only well-planned loans, based on high quality economic and sector work, lead to improved design, effective implementation, and lower cost. It is better to spend more time getting the program right than to lend prematurely. However, none of these were done. As a result, loans came with extensive conditions that subverted the growth of democracy, hampered local economic growth, and enriched multinational corporations.

To evaluate his conclusion, it is instructive to look at those cases where Third World development actually succeeded: South Asia and China are the world's two greatest emerging markets. South Asia repeatedly resisted IMF conditions (especially South Korea and Malaysia) and China declined any IMF money whatsoever.

According to Stiglitz, IMF interventions all followed a similar free market formula. The IMF strongly advocated "shock therapy" in a rush to market economies, without first establishing institutions to protect the public and local commerce. Local social, political, and economic considerations were largely ignored. Privatization without land reform or strong competitive policies resulted in crony capitalism, large businesses run by organized crime, and neo-feudalism without a middle class. There is no doubt that monetary aid/lending could have an important and effective role in advocating country efforts to sustain external shocks and improve economic status but without strong forefront progress on the policy, the aid of balance of payments help could very well be counterproductive. The consequence will be escalated levels of debt, weakened policy credibility and a lot more difficult task of adjustment in the future.

The IMF also foisted premature capital market liberalization (free flow of capital) without institutional regulation of the financial sector. This destabilized entire developing economies by causing massive inflows of 'hot' short-term investment capital; then when inflation rose, the IMF's loan conditions imposed fiscal austerity and dramatically rising interest rates. This led to widespread bankruptcies without legal protection, massive unemployment without a social safety net, and the prompt withdrawal of foreign capital. The few remaining solvent owners, with zero opportunity for business growth, stripped assets for any value they could.

With loans defaulted and entire nations thrown into economic and social chaos, the IMF rushed bailouts directed mainly to foreign creditors. This fueled speculative runs on currency, and most of the bailout money soon wound up in Swiss and Caribbean bank accounts. As a result, Third World citizens carried much of the costs and few of the benefits of IMF loans, and a moral hazard ensued among the financial community: foreign creditors made bad loans, knowing that if the debtors defaulted, the IMF would pick up the tab (see Long Term Capital Management, whose overexposure in Southeast Asia might have brought down international financial markets without a massive bailout). Meanwhile, the IMF urged cash-strapped countries to further privatize—in effect selling their assets at a fraction of their value to raise cash. Foreign corporations then bought up the assets at rock-bottom prices.

Predictably, great resentment resulted from the IMF's agenda.

Stabilization is on the agenda; job creation is not. Taxation, and its adverse effects, are on the agenda; land reform is off. There is money to bail out banks but not to pay for improved education and health services, let alone to bail out workers who are thrown out of their jobs as a result of the IMF's macroeconomic mismanagement. Ordinary people as well as many government officials and business people continue to refer to the economic and social storm that hit their nations simply as 'the IMF' — the way one would say 'the plague' or 'the Great Depression' [80-81, 97].

John Maynard Keynes helped conceive of the IMF as a fund to help developing countries grow at full employment. So why the consistent and disastrous failure to live up to this mandate?

The IMF is pursuing not just the objectives set out in its original mandate, of enhancing global stability and ensuring that there are funds for countries facing a threat of recession to pursue expansionary policies. It is also pursuing the interests of the financial community. This means that the IMF has objectives that are often in conflict with each other [206-7].

The global financial community apparently did not see the IMF's track record as one of conflicted interests or consistent failure: IMF managing director Stanley Fischer and Treasury Secretary Robert Rubin both left for multimillion-dollar jobs at Citigroup.

Stiglitz believes the IMF and World Bank should be reformed, not dismantled—with a growing population, malaria and AIDS pandemics, and global environmental challenges, Keynes' mandate for equitable growth is more urgent now than ever. He advocates a gradual, sequential, and selective approach to institutional development, land reform and privatization, capital market liberalization, competition policies, worker safety nets, health infrastructure, and education. Different countries will need to follow different paths. Selective policies would direct funds to programs and governments which had success in the past. He also points out "global governance without global government," and suggests that we need to recognize the inequities of the "global economic architecture." Based on the recognition, there is a need of rectification of the developed nations oriented imbalances, and should focus on developing nations. Lastly, democratic disciplines are needed to ensure that financial institutions serve general interests.

Debt forgiveness should be extended, building on the success of the Jubilee Movement. Since the IMF loans primarily benefited foreigners and government officials, he argues it is unjust and onerous that citizens of developing nations be heavily taxed to pay them off.

Not coincidentally, Stiglitz believes that promoting local and international democracy is fundamental to reforming global economic policy. Democracy aids social stability, empowers the free flow of information, and promotes a decentralized economy upon which efficient and equitable economies rely. Extending IMF and WTO voting rights to developing countries, along with public accountability, would be a good start. For Stiglitz, promoting democracy comes before promoting business.

== Global governance without global government ==
Stiglitz argues current procedures for globalization is "global governance without global government". Unlike states, which separation of powers exists, International financial institutions, IMF, WTO, and World Bank, lack any necessary checks and balances. Those international financial institutions are isolated and sole deciders of financial policies and enforce without hearing any dissenting opinions, generally developing countries. IMF’s reckless liberalization, privatization, and deregulation violate developing countries’ sovereignties. Thus rather than working for equity and extermination of poverty, financial institutions become spokespersons of the financial community. The procedures and rhetoric of financial institutions widen the gap between developed and developing, which resulted from undemocratic paternalism and lack of accountability, transparency. Undemocratic paternalism is inflicted through ideology, assuming the model IMF presents is universally applicable. Moreover, lack of accountability and transparency is pronounced in unfair trade agenda, the Uruguay round. The North, EU and US achieved bilateral conventions called Blair House Agreement to circumscribe the regulations imposed on subsidization of agriculture, leading to the failure of Uruguay round and exposing developing countries to greater risk and volatility. Stiglitz dismisses the current global governance without global government and champions global social justice, global affinity to exterminate poverty and create better environment.

== Globalization and its Discontents Revisited ==
In 2017, Stiglitz published a new edition of the book which explored more recent political developments in the developed world pertaining to the effects of neoliberal globalization. He argues that populist anti-globalization movements such as that of the Trump presidency, while accurately identifying certain negative effects of free trade agreements (e.g. NAFTA, which lowered prices for American consumers at the cost of local manufacturing jobs) other aspects of their critiques are flawed as are their prescriptions.

Stiglitz notes how Trump framed the United States as the victim of globalization, when it fact, many of the specific agreements his campaign took issues with were instigated at the behest of the US, primarily to its benefit, or at least, the benefit of the American business community, who, in the case of NAFTA, offshored large swathes of the US manufacturing base to the developing world, taking advantage of weaker regulatory and taxation regimes and cheap, non-unionized labour. Stiglitz is sympathetic to the grievances of the working classes in the developed world with respect to globalization, but sees right-wing populism as unlikely to provide substantial solutions. He argues that Trump’s proposed rewriting of NAFTA and imposition of 65% tariffs on Chinese goods, in addition to being in practice very difficult to enact, would have worsened the plight of the very groups they were intended to benefit.

== Reception ==
=== Praise ===
Globalisation and Its Discontents has earned praises from many reviewers. Noted investor George Soros describes the book as "Penetrating, insightful.... A seminal work that must be read."

Will Hutton from the British Guardian wrote: "Stiglitz finishes his book with seven action points for change. He is not a global pessimist, but a realist - and instead of placing him in a neat box labelled 'important contribution to the debate,' we should listen to him urgently."

The influential New York Review of Books stated that "Joseph Stiglitz [...] has made incisive and highly valued contributions to the explanation of an astonishingly broad range of economic phenomena, including taxes, interest rates, consumer behavior, corporate finance, and much else. Especially among economists who are still of active working age, he ranks as a titan of the field," concluding that "Stiglitz’s book will surely claim a large place on the public stage. It certainly stands as the most forceful argument that has yet been made against the IMF and its policies."

Business Week's Michael J. Mandel opined that "Stiglitz had a ringside seat for most of the major economic events of the last decade, including the Asian economic crisis and the transition of the former Soviet economies, as well as the administration of development programs throughout the world… This book recounts Stiglitz’s experiences, opening a window on previously unseen aspects of global economic policy. It is designed to provoke a healthy debate and… shows us in poignant terms why developing nations feel the economic deck is stacked against them."

=== Criticism ===
The book has also received criticisms from various opponents of his intellectual work affiliated with libertarian and (neo)conservative schools of thought. For instance, D. W. MacKenzie claims in the libertarian journal Public Choice that Stiglitz mischaracterizes government failures as market failures. Most of Stiglitz's examples refer to government intervention that benefited special interests. Such examples are collective action failures of government through rent seeking.

Kenneth Rogoff, IMF Director of research, called Stiglitz's analysis "at best highly controversial, at worst, snake oil" and stated that "The Stiglitzian prescription (for third world nations in a debt crisis) is to raise the profile of fiscal deficits, that is, to issue more debt and to print more money. You seem to believe that if a distressed government issues more currency, its citizens will suddenly think it more valuable. You seem to believe that when investors are no longer willing to hold a government's debt, all that needs to be done is to increase the supply and it will sell like hot cakes."

Daniel T. Griswold of the libertarian think tank Cato Institute labels the book a "score-settling exercise distorted by the author's own political prejudices and personal animus." Griswold takes issue with what he claims is Stiglitz's assumption "that protectionism enriches those nations that practice it" and notes that "while he is not questioning free trade, Stiglitz is disparaging the free flow of capital. The book blames the East Asian Financial Crisis almost entirely on one factor: capital account liberalisation." Stiglitz demonstrates this belief by "prais[ing] Malaysia for spurning IMF advice ... by imposing capital controls to stem the flight of short term flows." Griswold also states that Stiglitz provided no evidence to support his belief that Malaysia was rewarded for their efforts. He counters that Malaysia's GDP growth rate had fallen much farther than the other countries listed by Stiglitz, down to 6.7% and "recovered less rapidly in 1999 and 2000 even though [others] did not resort to capital controls Stiglitz champions." Griswold concludes by arguing that Stiglitz "distorts the history of the East Asian Miracle", while with Russian privatisation he "ignores the fact that Russia's initial reforms were timid and half baked" and that the IMF with its beliefs in bail outs and non-market exchange rates is not the "great symbol of market fundamentalism".

== Literature ==
- Enrico Colombatto: Book Review. In: Journal of Libertarian Studies. Volume 18, No. 1, Winter 2004, pp. 89–98 (PDF)
- Daniel T. Griswold: Book Review. In: Cato Journal. Vol. 22, No. 3, Winter 2003, pp. 566–569 (PDF)
- D. W. MacKenzie: Book Review. In: Public Choice. Volume 120, Numbers 3-4, September 2004, pp. 234–239 (PDF)
- James M. Rossi: Book Review: Globalization and Its Discontents. In: Human Nature Review. 2002, Volume 2, pp. 293–296
