= Joseph Stiglitz =

American economist and Nobel Laureate (born 1943)

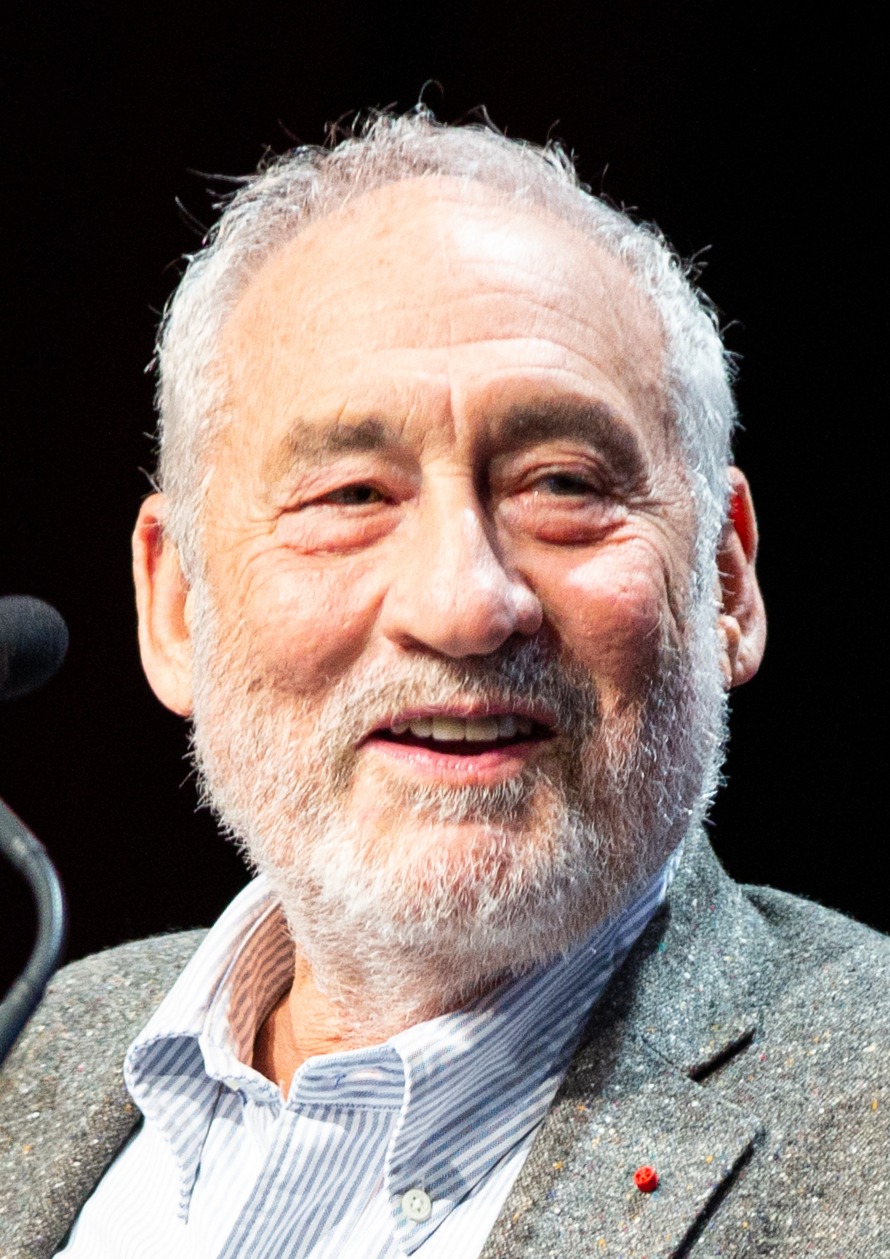
- Stiglitz in 2019

Chief Economist of the World Bank
- In office February 1997 – February 2000
- President: James Wolfensohn
- Preceded by: Michael Bruno
- Succeeded by: Nicholas Stern

17th Chair of the Council of Economic Advisers
- In office June 28, 1995 – February 10, 1997
- President: Bill Clinton
- Preceded by: Laura Tyson
- Succeeded by: Janet Yellen

Personal details
- Born: Joseph Eugene Stiglitz; February 9, 1943 (age 83) Gary, Indiana, U.S.
- Party: Democratic
- Spouses: Jane Hannaway (m. 1978, divorced); Anya Schiffrin (m. 2004)
- Education: Amherst College (BA); Massachusetts Institute of Technology (MA, PhD)

Academic background
- Thesis: Studies in the Theory of Growth and Income Distribution (1967)
- Doctoral advisor: Robert Solow
- Influences: John Maynard Keynes; Robert Solow; James Mirrlees; Henry George

Academic work
- Discipline: Macroeconomics; Public economics; Information economics
- School or tradition: Neo-Keynesian economics
- Doctoral students: Katrin Eggenberger; Anton Korinek
- Notable ideas: Screening; Taxation; Unemployment; Market failure; Information asymmetry; Economic inequality
- Website: Information at IDEAS / RePEc

Joseph Eugene Stiglitz (/ˈstɪɡlɪts/; born February 9, 1943) is an American New Keynesian economist, a public policy analyst, political activist, and a professor at Columbia University. He is a recipient of the Nobel Memorial Prize in Economic Sciences (2001) and the John Bates Clark Medal (1979). He is a former senior vice president and chief economist of the World Bank. He is also a former member and chairman of the U.S. Council of Economic Advisers. He is known for his support for the Georgism public finance theory and for his critical view of the management of globalization, of laissez-faire economists (whom he calls "free-market fundamentalists"), and of international institutions such as the International Monetary Fund and the World Bank.

In 2000, Stiglitz founded the Initiative for Policy Dialogue (IPD), a think tank on international development based at Columbia University. He has been a member of the Columbia faculty since 2001 and received the university's highest academic rank (university professor) in 2003. He was the founding chair of the university's Committee on Global Thought. He also chairs the University of Manchester's Brooks World Poverty Institute. He was a member of the Pontifical Academy of Social Sciences. In 2009, the President of the United Nations General Assembly Miguel d'Escoto Brockmann, appointed Stiglitz as the chairman of the U.N. Commission on Reforms of the International Monetary and Financial System, where he oversaw suggested proposals and commissioned a report on reforming the international monetary and financial system. He served as the chair of the international Commission on the Measurement of Economic Performance and Social Progress, appointed by the French President Sarkozy, which issued its report in 2010, Mismeasuring our Lives: Why GDP doesn't add up, and currently serves as co-chair of its successor, the High Level Expert Group on the Measurement of Economic Performance and Social Progress. From 2011 to 2014, Stiglitz was the president of the International Economic Association (IEA). He presided over the organization of the IEA triennial world congress held near the Dead Sea in Jordan in June 2014.

In 2011, Stiglitz was named as one of the 100 most influential people in the world by Time magazine. Stiglitz's work focuses on income distribution from a Georgist perspective, asset risk management, corporate governance, and international trade. He is the author of several books, the latest being The Road to Freedom (2024); People, Power, and Profits (2019); The Euro: How a Common Currency Threatens the Future of Europe (2016); The Great Divide: Unequal Societies and What We Can Do About Them (2015); Rewriting the Rules of the American Economy: An Agenda for Growth and Shared Prosperity (2015); and Creating a Learning Society: A New Approach to Growth Development and Social Progress (2014). He is also one of the 25 leading figures on the Information and Democracy Commission launched by Reporters Without Borders. According to the Open Syllabus Project, Stiglitz is the fifth most frequently cited author on college syllabi for economics courses.

== Life and career ==
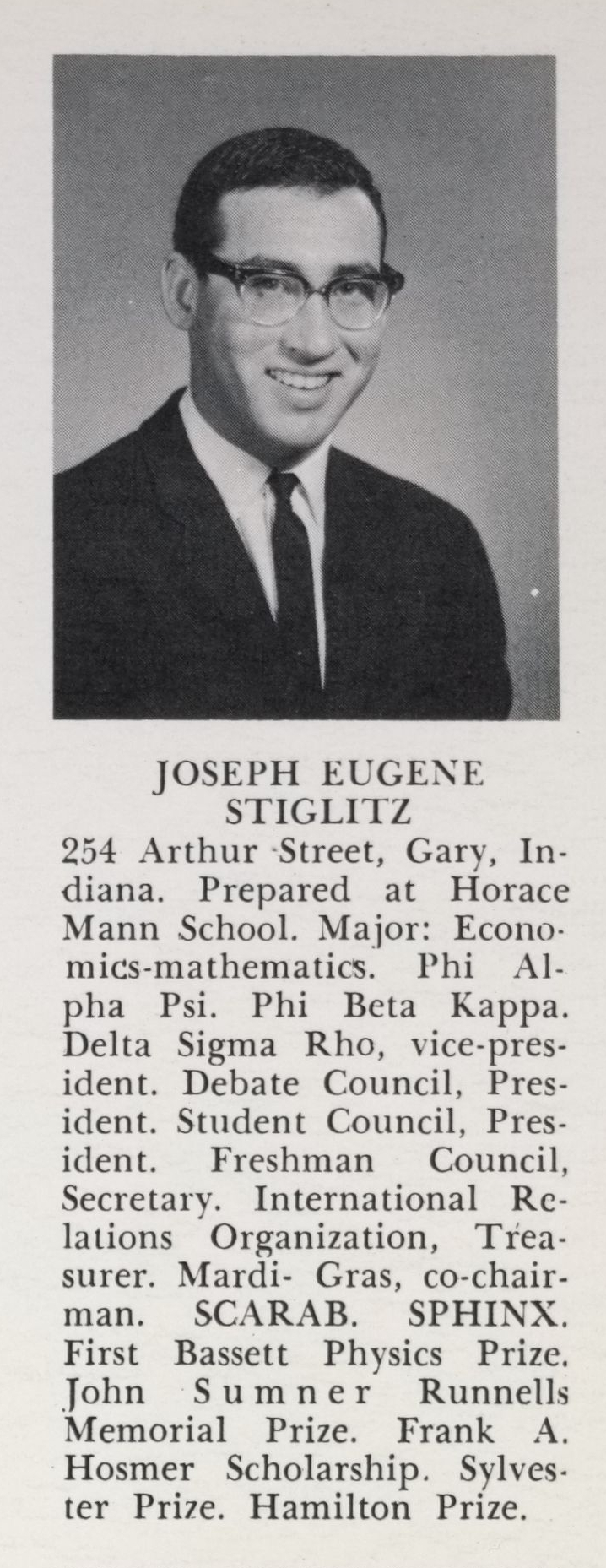
Stiglitz in the Amherst College yearbook, 1964

Stiglitz was born in Gary, Indiana into a Jewish family. His mother was Charlotte (née Fishman) was a teacher at Purdue University Calumet Campus, and his father was Nathaniel David Stiglitz, an insurance salesman. Stiglitz attended Amherst College, where he was a National Merit Scholar, active on the debate team, and president of the student government. During his senior year at Amherst College, he studied at the Massachusetts Institute of Technology (MIT), where he later pursued graduate work. In Summer 1965, he moved to the University of Chicago to do research under Hirofumi Uzawa who had received an NSF grant. He studied for his PhD from MIT from 1966 to 1967, during which time he also held an MIT assistant professorship. Stiglitz stated that the particular style of MIT economics suited him well, describing it as "simple and concrete models, directed at answering important and relevant questions."

From 1966 to 1970 he was a research fellow at the University of Cambridge. Stiglitz initially arrived at Fitzwilliam College, Cambridge as a Fulbright Scholar in 1965, and he later won a Tapp Junior Research Fellowship at Gonville and Caius College, Cambridge which was instrumental in shaping his understanding of Keynes and macroeconomic theory. In subsequent years, he held academic positions at Yale, Stanford, Oxford—where he was Drummond Professor of Political Economy—and Princeton. Since 2001, Stiglitz has been a professor at Columbia University, with appointments at the Business School, the Department of Economics and the School of International and Public Affairs (SIPA), and is an editor of The Economists' Voice journal with J. Bradford DeLong and Aaron Edlin.

He teaches classes for a double-degree program between Sciences Po Paris and École Polytechnique in Economics and Public Policy. He has chaired the Brooks World Poverty Institute at the University of Manchester since 2005. Stiglitz is widely considered a New-Keynesian economist, although at least one economics journalist says his work cannot be so clearly categorized.

Stiglitz has held several policy roles throughout his career. He served in the Clinton administration as the chair of the President's Council of Economic Advisers (1995–1997). At the World Bank, he served as a senior vice-president and the chief economist from 1997 to 2000. He was fired by the World Bank for expressing dissent with its policies. Stiglitz has advised American president Barack Obama, but has criticized the Obama Administration's financial-industry rescue plan. He said whoever designed the Obama administration's bank rescue plan is "either in the pocket of the banks or they're incompetent."

In October 2008, the President of the United Nations General Assembly asked him to chair a commission drafting a report on the reasons for and solutions to the 2008 financial crisis. In response, the commission produced the Stiglitz Report.

On July 25, 2011, Stiglitz participated in the "I Forro Social del 15M" organized in Madrid, expressing his support for the 15M Movement protestors.

Stiglitz was the president of the International Economic Association from 2011 to 2014.

On September 27, 2015, the United Kingdom Labour Party announced that Stiglitz was to sit on its Economic Advisory Committee along with five other world-leading economists.

Stiglitz serves on the Executive Advisory Board of the World.Minds Foundation, contributing to global ethical discussions on science, society, and responsibility.

He was among the authors of the 2026 Paris manifesto against international oligarchy, which demanded a wealth tax, increased public control over the mass media, and entrusting artificial intelligence to nonprofits.

== Contributions to economics ==
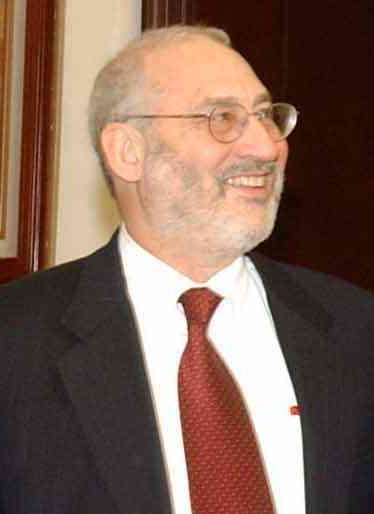
Stiglitz at a conference in Mexico in 2009

After the 2018 mid-term elections in the United States, he wrote a statement about the importance of economic justice to the survival of democracy worldwide.

=== Risk aversion ===
After getting his Ph.D. from M.I.T. in 1967, Stiglitz co-authored one of his first papers with Michael Rothschild for the Journal of Economic Theory in 1970. Stiglitz and Rothschild built upon works by economists such as Robert Solow on the concept of risk aversion, expanding the concept as mean-preserving spreads or economic consensus. More specifically, Stiglitz and Rothschild showed three plausible definitions of a variable X being 'more variable' than a variable Y were all equivalent – Y being equal to X plus noise, every risk-averse agent preferring Y to X, and Y having more weight in its tails, and that none of these were always consistent with X having a higher statistical variance than Y – a commonly used definition at the time. In a second paper, they analyzed the theoretical consequences of risk aversion in various circumstances, such as an individual's savings decisions and a firm's production decisions.

=== Henry George theorem ===
Stiglitz made early contributions to a theory of public finance stating that an optimal supply of local public goods can be funded entirely through capture of the land rents generated by those goods (when population distributions are optimal). Stiglitz dubbed this the 'Henry George theorem' in reference to the radical classical economist Henry George who famously advocated for land value taxation. Stiglitz's finding stems from the fact that rivalry for public goods is geographic, so competition for access to any beneficial public good will increase land values by at least as much as its outlay cost. Furthermore, Stiglitz shows that a single tax on land rents is necessary to provide the optimal supply of local public investment. Stiglitz also shows how the theorem could be used to find the optimal size of a city or firm.

=== Information asymmetry ===
Stiglitz's most famous research was on screening, a technique used by one economic agent to extract otherwise private information from another. It was for this contribution to the theory of information asymmetry that he shared the Nobel Memorial Prize in Economics with George A. Akerlof and A. Michael Spence in 2001 "for laying the foundations for the theory of markets with asymmetric information".

Much of Stiglitz's work on information economics demonstrates situations in which incomplete information prevents markets from achieving social efficiency. His paper with Andrew Weiss showed that if banks use interest rates to infer information about borrowers' types (adverse selection effect), or to encourage their actions following borrowing (incentive effect), then credit will be rationed below the optimal level, even in a competitive market. Stiglitz and Rothschild showed that in an insurance market, firms have an incentive to undermine a 'pooling equilibrium', where all agents are offered the same full-insurance policy, by offering cheaper partial insurance that would only be attractive to the low-risk types, meaning that a competitive market can only achieve partial coverage of agents. Stiglitz and Grossman showed that trivially small information acquisition costs prevent financial markets from achieving complete informational efficiency, since agents will have an incentive to free-ride on others' information acquisition, and acquire this information indirectly by observing market prices.

=== Monopolistic competition ===
Stiglitz, together with Avinash Dixit, created a tractable model of monopolistic competition that was an alternative to traditional perfect-competition models of general equilibrium. They showed that in the presence of increasing returns to scale, the entry of firms is socially too small. The model was extended to show that when consumers have a preference for diversity, entry can be socially too large. The modeling approach was used by Paul Krugman in his analysis of the non-comparative advantage trading patterns.

=== Shapiro–Stiglitz efficiency wage model ===
In the Shapiro–Stiglitz model of efficiency wages, workers are paid at a level that dissuades shirking. This prevents wages from dropping to market-clearing levels. Full employment cannot be achieved because workers would shirk if they were not threatened with the possibility of unemployment. Because of this, the curve for the no-shirking condition (labeled NSC) goes to infinity at full employment.

Stiglitz also did research on efficiency wages, and helped create what became known as the "Shapiro–Stiglitz model" to explain why there is unemployment even in equilibrium, why wages are not bid down sufficiently by job seekers (in the absence of minimum wages) so that everyone who wants a job finds one, and to question whether the neoclassical paradigm could explain involuntary unemployment. An answer to these puzzles was proposed by Shapiro and Stiglitz in 1984: "Unemployment is driven by the information structure of employment". Two basic observations undergird their analysis:

1. Unlike other forms of capital, humans can choose their level of effort.
2. It is costly for firms to determine how much effort workers are exerting.

Some key implications of this model are:

1. Wages do not fall enough during recessions to prevent unemployment from rising. If labor demand falls, wages fall. But because wages have fallen, the probability of 'shirking' (workers not exerting effort) has risen. To maintain employment levels, wages must fall enough that workers are less productive due to shirking. As a consequence, in the model, wages do not fall enough to maintain employment levels at the previous state, because firms want to avoid excessive shirking by their workers. So, unemployment must rise during recessions, because wages are kept 'too high'.
2. Possible corollary: Wage sluggishness. Moving from one private cost of hiring (w∗) to another private cost of hiring (w∗∗) will require each firm to repeatedly re-optimize wages in response to shifting unemployment rate. Firms cannot cut wages until unemployment rises sufficiently (a coordination problem).

The outcome is never Pareto efficient.

1. Each firm employs too few workers, because the cost of employing too many workers would be faced by the firm alone, while the cost of unemployment is shared by the firm and its competitors, indeed it is shared by all firms that pay taxes in the country. This means that firms do not "internalize" the "external" cost of unemployment – they do not factor how large-scale unemployment harms society when assessing their own costs. This leads to a negative externality as marginal social cost exceeds the firm's marginal cost (MSC = Firm's Private Marginal Cost + Marginal External Cost of increased social unemployment).
2. There are also positive externalities: each firm increases the asset value of unemployment for all other firms when they hire during recessions. By creating hypercompetitive labor markets, all firms (the winners when laborers compete) experience an increase in value. However, this effect of increased valuation is very unapparent, because the first problem (the negative externality of sub-optimal hiring) clearly dominates since the 'natural rate of unemployment' is always too high.

=== Practical implications of Stiglitz's theories ===
The practical implications of Stiglitz's work in political economy and their economic policy implications have been subject to debate. Stiglitz himself has evolved his political-economic discourse over time.

Once incomplete and imperfect information is introduced, Chicago-school defenders of the market system cannot sustain descriptive claims of the Pareto efficiency of the real world. Thus, Stiglitz's use of rational-expectations equilibrium assumptions to achieve a more realistic understanding of capitalism than is usual among rational-expectations theorists leads, paradoxically, to the conclusion that capitalism deviates from the model in a way that justifies state action – socialism – as a remedy.

The effect of Stiglitz's influence is to make economics even more presumptively interventionist than Samuelson preferred. Samuelson treated market failure as an exception to the general rule of efficient markets. But the Greenwald-Stiglitz theorem posits market failure as the norm, establishing "that government could potentially almost always improve upon the market's resource allocation." And the Sappington-Stiglitz theorem "establishes that an ideal government could do better running an enterprise itself than it could through privatization"

— Stiglitz 1994, p. 179.

As David L. Prychitko discusses in his critique of Whither Socialism?, he thought that Stiglitz's work was great; however, he asked: "How will the coercive institutions of the state be constrained?"

== Government ==
=== Clinton administration ===
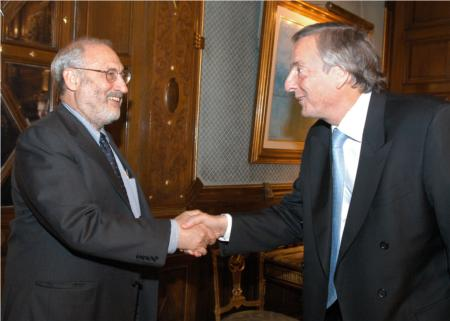
Néstor Kirchner (right) with Joseph Stiglitz

Stiglitz joined the Clinton Administration in 1993, serving first as a member during 1993–1995, and was then appointed Chairman of the Council of Economic Advisers on June 28, 1995.

Stiglitz always had a poor relationship with Treasury Secretary Lawrence Summers. In 2000, Summers successfully petitioned for Stiglitz's removal, supposedly in exchange for World Bank President James Wolfensohn's re-appointment – an exchange that Wolfensohn denies took place. Whether Summers ever made such a blunt demand is questionable – Wolfensohn claims he would "have told him to *** himself".

Stiglitz resigned from the World Bank in January 2000, a month before his term expired. The Bank's president, James Wolfensohn, announced Stiglitz's resignation in November 1999 and also announced that Stiglitz would stay on as Special Advisor to the President, and would chair the search committee for a successor.

Joseph E. Stiglitz said today [Nov. 24, 1999] that he would resign as the World Bank's chief economist after using the position for nearly three years to raise pointed questions about the effectiveness of conventional approaches to helping poor countries.

In this role, he continued criticism of the International Monetary Fund, and, by implication, the US Treasury Department. In April 2000, in an article for The New Republic, he wrote:

They'll say the IMF is arrogant. They'll say the IMF doesn't really listen to the developing countries it is supposed to help. They'll say the IMF is secretive and insulated from democratic accountability. They'll say the IMF's economic 'remedies' often make things worse – turning slowdowns into recessions and recessions into depressions. And they'll have a point. I was chief economist at the World Bank from 1996 until last November, during the gravest global economic crisis in a half-century. I saw how the IMF, alongside the U.S. Treasury Department, responded. And I was appalled.

Stiglitz's protector-of-sorts at the World Bank, Wolfensohn, had privately empathized with Stiglitz's views but worried about his second term, which Summers had threatened to veto. Stanley Fischer, deputy managing director of the IMF, called a special staff meeting and informed the gathering that Wolfensohn had agreed to fire Stiglitz. Meanwhile, the bank's External Affairs department told the press that Stiglitz had not been fired; his post had merely been abolished.

=== Initiative for Policy Dialogue ===
In July 2000, Stiglitz founded the Initiative for Policy Dialogue.

=== Commission on the Measurement of Economic Performance and Social Progress ===
At the beginning of 2008, Stiglitz chaired the Commission on the Measurement of Economic Performance and Social Progress, also known as the Stiglitz-Sen-Fitoussi Commission, initiated by President Sarkozy of France. The Commission held its first plenary meeting on April 22–23, 2008, in Paris. Its final report was made public on September 14, 2009.

=== Commission of Experts on Reforms of the International Monetary and Financial System ===
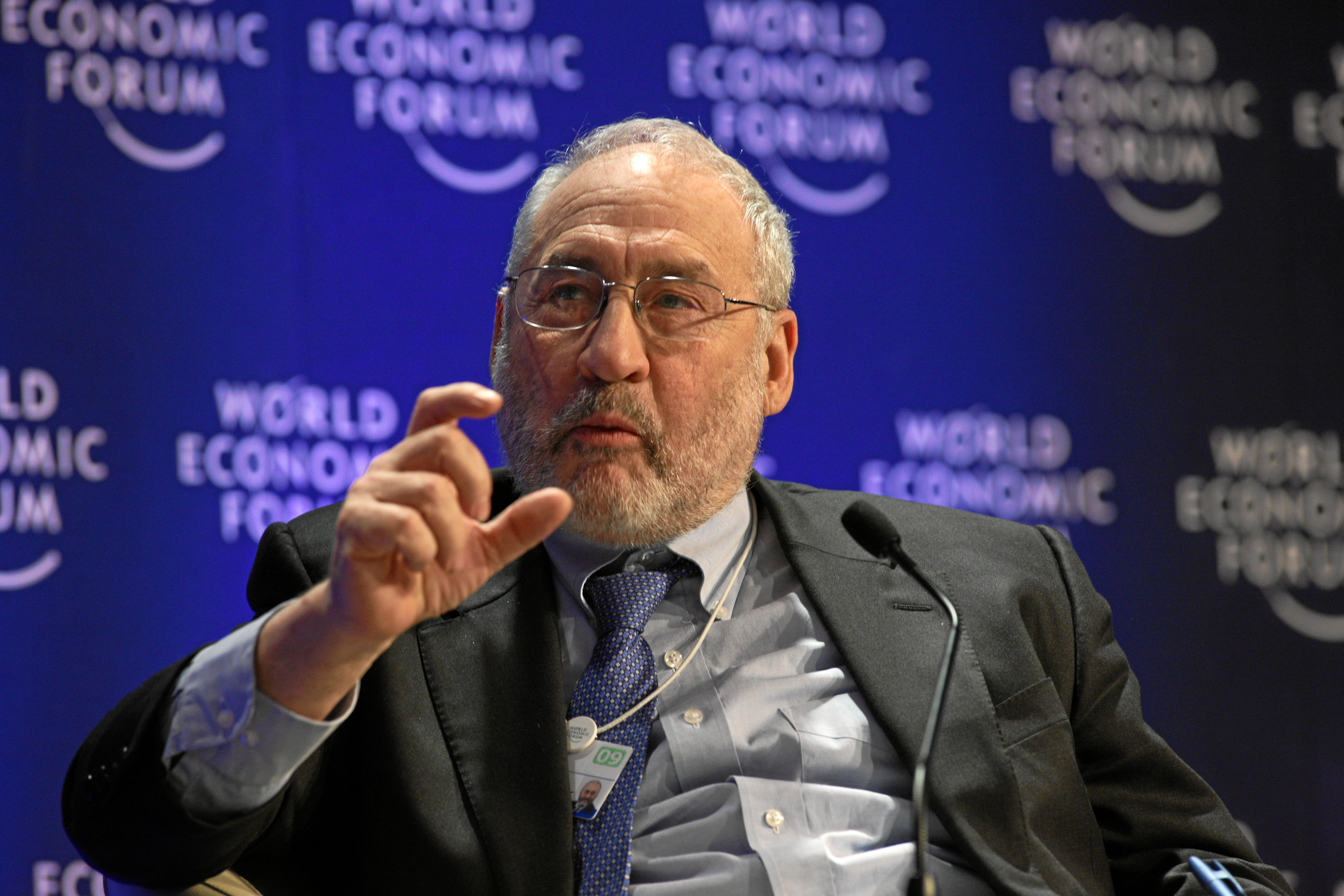
Stiglitz at the World Economic Forum annual meeting in Davos, 2009

In 2009, Stiglitz chaired the Commission of Experts on Reforms of the International Monetary and Financial System which was convened by the President of the United Nations General Assembly "to review the workings of the global financial system, including major bodies such as the World Bank and the IMF, and to suggest steps to be taken by Member States to secure a more sustainable and just global economic order". Its final report was released on September 21, 2009.

=== Greek debt crisis ===
In 2010, Stiglitz acted as an advisor to the Greek government during the Greek debt crisis. He appeared on Bloomberg TV for an interview on the risks of Greece defaulting, in which he stated that he was very confident that Greece would not default. He went on to say that Greece was under "speculative attack" and though it had "short-term liquidity problems ... and would benefit from Solidarity Bonds", the country was "on track to meet its obligations".

The next day, during a BBC interview, Stiglitz stated that "there's no problem of Greece or Spain meeting their interest payments". He argued nonetheless, that it would be desirable and needed for all of Europe to make a clear statement of belief in social solidarity and that they "stand behind Greece". Confronted with the statement: "Greece's difficulty is that the magnitude of debt is far greater than the capacity of the economy to service", Stiglitz replied, "That's absurd".

In 2012, Stiglitz described the European austerity plans as a "suicide-pact". In 2015, he said that the programmer of austerity in Greece had been "an enormous mistake", that the International Monetary Fund, European Central Bank and the European Commission had "criminal responsibility for causing a major recession". He argued that Greek debt should be written off.

=== Scotland ===
Since March 2012, Stiglitz has been a member of the Scottish Government's Fiscal Commission Working Group, which oversees the work to establish a fiscal and macroeconomic framework for an independent Scotland on behalf of the Scottish Council of Economic Advisers. Together with Professors Andrew Hughes Hallett, Sir James Mirrlees and Frances Ruane, Stiglitz will "advise on the establishment of a credible Fiscal Commission which entrenches financial responsibility and ensures market confidence".

=== Labour Party ===
In July 2015, Stiglitz endorsed Jeremy Corbyn's campaign in the Labour Party leadership election. He said: "I am not surprised at all that there is a demand for a strong anti-austerity movement around increased concern about inequality. The promises of New Labour in the UK and of the Clintonites in the US have been a disappointment."

On September 27, 2015, it was announced that he had been appointed to the British Labour Party's Economic Advisory Committee, convened by Shadow Chancellor John McDonnell and reporting to Labour Party Leader Jeremy Corbyn, although he reportedly failed to attend the first meeting.

== Economic views ==
=== Market efficiency ===
For Stiglitz, there is no such thing as an invisible hand, in the sense that free markets lead to efficiency as if guided by unseen forces. According to Stiglitz:

Whenever there are "externalities" – where the actions of an individual have impacts on others for which they do not pay or for which they are not compensated – markets will not work well. But recent research has shown that these externalities are pervasive, whenever there is imperfect information or imperfect risk markets – that is always. The real debate today is about finding the right balance between the market and government. Both are needed. They can each complement each other. This balance will differ from time to time and place to place.

In an interview in 2007, Stiglitz explained further:

The theories that I (and others) helped develop explained why unfettered markets often not only do not lead to social justice, but do not even produce efficient outcomes. Interestingly, there has been no intellectual challenge to the refutation of Adam Smith's invisible hand: individuals and firms, in the pursuit of their self-interest, are not necessarily, or in general, led as if by an invisible hand, to economic efficiency.

The preceding claim is based on Stiglitz's 1986 paper, "Externalities in Economies with Imperfect Information and Incomplete Markets", which describes a general methodology to deal with externalities and for calculating optimal corrective taxes in a general equilibrium context. In the opening remarks for his prize acceptance at Aula Magna, Stiglitz said:

I hope to show that Information Economics represents a fundamental change in the prevailing paradigm within economics. Problems of information are central to understanding not only market economics but also political economy, and in the last section of this lecture, I explore some of the implications of information imperfections for political processes.

=== Support for anti-austerity movement in Spain ===
On July 25, 2011, Stiglitz participated in the "I Foro Social del 15M" organized in Madrid (Spain) expressing his support for the anti-austerity movement in Spain. During an informal speech, he made a brief review of some of the problems in Europe and in the United States, the serious unemployment rate and the situation in Greece. "This is an opportunity for economic contribution social measures", argued Stiglitz, who made a speech about the way authorities are handling the political exit to the crisis. He encouraged those present to respond to the ideas with good ideas. "This does not work, you have to change it", he said.

=== Criticism of rating agencies ===
Stiglitz has been critical of rating agencies, describing them as the "key culprit" in the 2008 financial crisis, noting "they were the party that performed the alchemy that converted the securities from F-rated to A-rated. The banks could not have done what they did without the complicity of the rating agencies."

Stiglitz co-authored a paper with Peter Orszag in 2002 titled "Implications of the New Fannie Mae and Freddie Mac Risk-Based Capital Standard" where they stated "on the basis of historical experience, the risk to the government from a potential default on GSE debt is effectively zero." However, "the risk-based capital standard ... may fail to reflect the probability of another Great Depression-like scenario."

=== Criticism of Trans-Pacific Partnership and Transatlantic Trade and Investment Partnership ===
Stiglitz warned that the Trans-Pacific Partnership (TPP) presented "grave risks" and it "serves the interests of the wealthiest."

Stiglitz also opposed the Transatlantic Trade and Investment Partnership (TTIP) trade deal between the European Union (EU) and the United States, and has argued that the United Kingdom should consider its withdrawal from the EU in the 2016 referendum on the matter if TTIP passes, saying that "the strictures imposed by TTIP would be sufficiently averse to the functioning of government that it would make me think over again about whether membership of the EU was a good idea".

=== Regulation ===
Stiglitz argues that relying solely on business self-interest as the means of achieving the well-being of society and economic efficiency is misleading, and that instead "What is needed is stronger norms, clearer understandings of what is acceptable – and what is not – and stronger laws and regulations to ensure that those that do not behave in ways that are consistent with these norms are held accountable".

=== Land value tax (Georgism) ===
Stiglitz argues that land value tax would improve the efficiency and equity of agricultural economies. Stiglitz believes that societies should rely on a generalized Henry George principle to finance public goods, protect natural resources, improve land use, and reduce the burden of rents and taxes on the poor while increasing productive capital formation. Stiglitz advocates taxing "natural resource rents at as close to 100 percent as possible" and that a corollary of this principle is that polluters should be taxed for "activities that generate negative externalities." Stiglitz therefore asserts that land value taxation is even better than its famous advocate Henry George thought.

=== The eurozone ===
Stiglitz has been critical of the eurozone, partially due to the uneven trade balance within the EU. After the Eurozone crisis, he called for its abolishment or reform. In a 2016 interview Stiglitz, stated that "the cost of keeping the Eurozone together probably exceeds the cost of breaking it up."

=== Free trade ===
In the 1990s, he wrote that "countries in North America and Europe should eliminate all tariffs and quotas". He came to hold less optimistic views of free trade, most famously detailed in his 2002 Globalization and Its Discontents.

Later, he has argued that "the American middle class is indeed the loser of globalization", although adding that "The very Americans who have been among the losers of globalization stand to be among the losers of a reversal of globalization." In 2024, Stiglitz spearheaded an open letter, with 15 other Nobel Prize in Economics laureates, arguing Donald Trump’s protectionist tariffs would reignite inflation in the United States.

=== Green economy ===
Stiglitz has called for a transition to a green economy. He supported the Green New Deal. In 2019, he wrote that "The Green New Deal would stimulate demand, ensuring that all available resources were used; and the transition to the green economy would likely usher in a new boom. Trump's focus on the industries of the past, like coal, is strangling the much more sensible move to wind and solar power. More jobs by far will be created in renewable energy than will be lost in coal." Stiglitz described the climate crisis as humanity's World War III.

=== Views on taxation ===
Stiglitz maintained the super-rich should pay taxes up to 70% to help deal with increasing inequality. Stiglitz stated a worldwide income tax rate of 70% on biggest earners "would clearly make sense". Stiglitz maintained society would become more egalitarian and cohesive. Stiglitz said a wealth taxes on fortunes acquired during many generations would have a larger influence. Stiglitz maintains most billionaires acquired much of their wealth through luck. He maintains Elizabeth Warren proposing a 2% tax on assets for people with assets of over $50 million and 3% on those with over $1 billion was "very reasonable" and would raise significant revenues that could improve some United States problems.

=== Views on artificial intelligence ===
Stiglitz was a signatory to a letter sent to the attorneys general of California and Delaware, opposing OpenAI's proposed transition from a not-for-profit entity to a public benefit corporation. The letter argued that the restructuring would undermine OpenAI's stated charitable purpose of developing artificial general intelligence to benefit "all of humanity." It further asserted that, if reorganized as a corporation, OpenAI would be legally obligated to prioritize the interests of its shareholders over broader goals of serving humanity as a whole.

== Books ==
Along with his technical economic publications (over 300 technical articles), Stiglitz is the author of books on issues from patent law to abuses in international trade.

=== Whither Socialism? (1994) ===
Whither Socialism? is based on Stiglitz's Wicksell Lectures, presented at the Stockholm School of Economics in 1990 and presents a summary of information economics and the theory of markets with imperfect information and imperfect competition, as well as being a critique of both free market and market socialist approaches (see Roemer critique, op. cit.). Stiglitz explains how the neoclassical, or Walrasian model ("Walrasian economics" refers to the result of the process which has given birth to a formal representation of Adam Smith's notion of the "invisible hand", along the lines put forward by Léon Walras and encapsulated in the general equilibrium model of Arrow–Debreu), may have wrongly encouraged the belief that market socialism could work. Stiglitz proposes an alternative model, based on the information economics established by the Greenwald–Stiglitz theorems.

One of the reasons Stiglitz sees for the critical failing in the standard neoclassical model, on which market socialism was built, is its failure to consider the problems that arise from lack of perfect information and from the costs of acquiring information. He also identifies problems arising from its assumptions concerning completeness.

=== Globalization and Its Discontents (2002) ===
In Globalization and Its Discontents, Stiglitz argues that what are often called "developing economies" are, in fact, not developing at all, and puts much of the blame on the IMF.

Stiglitz stresses: "Recent advances in economic theory" (in part referring to his own work) "have shown that whenever information is imperfect and markets are incomplete, which is to say always, and especially in developing countries, then the invisible hand works most imperfectly." As a result, Stiglitz continues, governments can improve the outcome by well-chosen interventions. Stiglitz argues that when families and firms seek to buy too little compared to what the economy can produce, governments can fight recessions and depressions by using expansionary monetary and fiscal policies to spur the demand for goods and services. At the microeconomic level, governments can regulate banks and other financial institutions to keep them sound. They can also use tax policy to steer investment into more productive industries and trade policies to allow new industries to mature to the point at which they can survive foreign competition. And governments can use a variety of devices, ranging from job creation to manpower training to welfare assistance, to put unemployed labor back to work and cushion human hardship.

Stiglitz argues that the IMF has done great damage through the economic policies it has prescribed that countries must follow in order to qualify for IMF loans, or for loans from banks and other private-sector lenders that look to the IMF to indicate whether a borrower is creditworthy. The organization and its officials, he argues, have ignored the implications of incomplete information, inadequate markets, and unworkable institutions – all of which are especially characteristic of newly developing countries. As a result, Stiglitz argues, the IMF has often called for policies that conform to textbook economics but do not make sense for the countries to which the IMF is recommending them. Stiglitz seeks to show that these policies have been disastrous for the countries that have followed them.

=== The Price of Inequality (2012) ===
The book received the Robert F. Kennedy Center for Justice and Human Rights 2013 Book Award, given annually to the book that "most faithfully and forcefully reflects Robert Kennedy's purposes – his concern for the poor and the powerless, his struggle for honest and even-handed justice, his conviction that a decent society must assure all young people a fair chance, and his faith that a free democracy can act to remedy disparities of power and opportunity."

=== People, Power and Profits: Progressive Capitalism for an Age of Discontent (2019) ===
Daniel W. Drezner gave the book a mixed review in The New York Times.

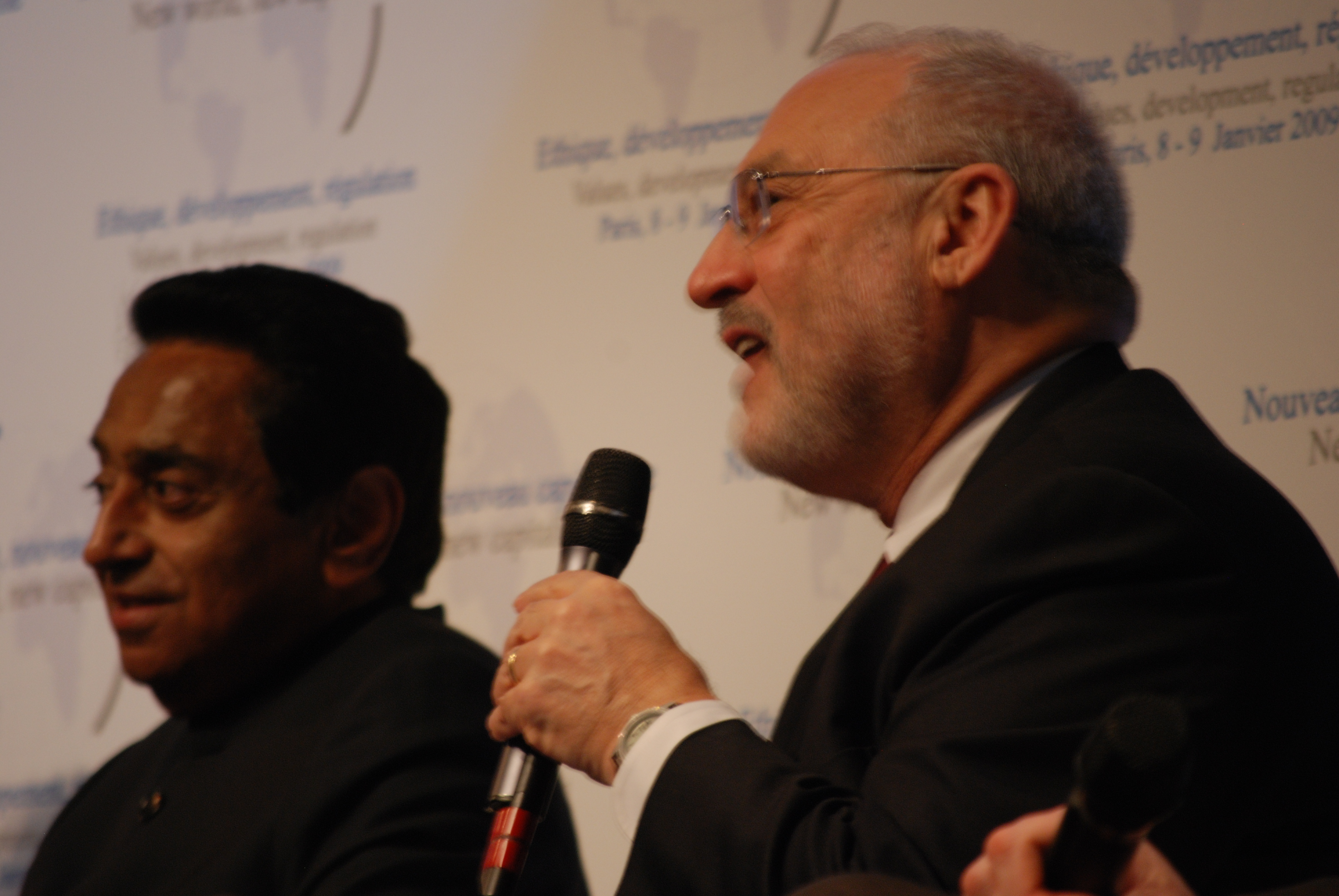
Joseph Stiglitz and Kamal Nath

=== The Road to Freedom: Economics and the Good Society (2024) ===
In The Road to Freedom, Stiglitz challenges the claim by its adherents that neoliberalism is morally superior to its alternatives. The title is a pointed reference to Friedrich Hayek's famous treatise, The Road to Serfdom, and the book is a rejoinder to the economic theories of Hayek and Milton Friedman. Stiglitz proposes that his essay is based on experimental empirical research. He is concerned that free information will reduce the production of information quality and value in our economy as artificial intelligence gathers and reproduces it.

== Papers and conferences ==
Stiglitz wrote a series of papers and held a series of conferences explaining how such information uncertainties may have influence on everything from unemployment to lending shortages. As the chairman of the Council of Economic Advisers during the first term of the Clinton Administration and former chief economist at the World Bank, Stiglitz was able to put some of his views into action. For example, he was an outspoken critic of quickly opening up financial markets in developing countries. These markets rely on access to good financial data and sound bankruptcy laws, but he argued that many of these countries did not have the regulatory institutions needed to ensure that the markets would operate soundly.

In July 2020, Stiglitz alongside Hamid Rashid, the chief of Global Economic Monitoring at the UN Department of Economic and Social Affairs, published a report, pointing out that the quantitative easing policy implemented by the US after the 2008 financial crisis, had "basically exported a debt bubble to developing countries".

The economic analysis of Stiglitz and Ira Regmi on the pandemic-induced inflation of 2021–2023 concluded the causes were sector supply-side disruptions and the Ukraine war effects in food and energy sectors and not from the excessive pandemic spending in the United States.

== Awards and honors ==
In addition to being awarded the Nobel Memorial prize, Stiglitz has over 40 honorary doctorates and at least eight honorary professorships as well as an honorary deanship.

Stiglitz was elected to the American Academy of Arts and Sciences in 1983, the National Academy of Sciences in 1988, and the American Philosophical Society in 1997.

In 2009, he received the Golden Plate Award of the American Academy of Achievement presented by Awards Council member Archbishop Desmond Tutu at an awards ceremony at St. George's Cathedral in Cape Town, South Africa.

He received the 2010 Gerald Loeb Awards for Commentary for "Capitalist Fools and Wall Street's Toxic Message".

In 2011, he was named by Foreign Policy magazine on its list of top global thinkers. In February 2012, he was awarded the Legion of Honor, in the rank of Officer, by the French ambassador in the United States François Delattre. Stiglitz was elected a Foreign Member of the Royal Society (ForMemRS) in 2009. Stiglitz was awarded the 2018 Sydney Peace Prize.

== Personal life ==
Stiglitz married Jane Hannaway in 1978 but the couple later divorced. He married for the third time on October 28, 2004, to Anya Schiffrin, who works at the School of International and Public Affairs at Columbia University. He has four children and three grandchildren.

== Selected bibliography ==
=== Books ===
- Stiglitz, Joseph E.; Uzawa, Hirofumi (1969). Readings in the modern theory of economic growth. Cambridge, Massachusetts: The M.I.T. Press. ISBN 978-0262190558.
- Stiglitz, Joseph E.; Atkinson, Anthony B. (1980). Lectures on public economics. London New York: McGraw-Hill Book Co. ISBN 978-0070841055.
- Stiglitz, Joseph E.; Newbery, David M.G. (1981). The theory of commodity price stabilization: a study in the economics of risk. Oxford Oxford New York: Clarendon Press Oxford University Press. ISBN 978-0198284178.
- Stiglitz, Joseph E. (1989). The economic role of the state. Oxford, UK Cambridge, Massachusetts, US: Wiley-Blackwell. ISBN 978-0631171355.
- Stiglitz, Joseph E.; Boadway, Robin (1994). Economics and the Canadian economy. New York: W.W. Norton & Company. ISBN 978-0393965117.
- Stiglitz, Joseph E. (1994). Whither socialism?. Cambridge, Massachusetts, US: MIT Press. ISBN 978-0262691826.
- Stiglitz, Joseph E. (2000). Economics of the public sector (3rd ed.). New York: W.W. Norton & Company. ISBN 978-0393966510.
- Stiglitz, Joseph E.; Meier, Gerald M. (2001). Frontiers of development economics: the future in perspective. Washington, D.C. Oxford New York: World Bank Oxford University Press. ISBN 978-0195215922.
- Stiglitz, Joseph E.; Holzmann, Robert (2001). New ideas about old age security: toward sustainable pension systems in the 21st century. Washington, DC: World Bank. ISBN 978-0821348222.
- Stiglitz, Joseph E.; Yusuf, Shahid (2001). Rethinking the East Asia miracle. Washington, D.C.; New York: World Bank Oxford University Press. ISBN 978-0195216004.
- Stiglitz, Joseph E. (2001). Chang, Ha-Joon (ed.). Joseph Stiglitz and the World Bank: the rebel within. London, England: Anthem Press. ISBN 978-1898855538.
- Stiglitz, Joseph E.; Sah, Raaj K. (1992). Peasants versus city-dwellers: taxation and the burden of economic development. Oxford New York: Clarendon Press Oxford University Press. ISBN 978-0199253579. (Reprinted 2005.)
- Stiglitz, Joseph E. (2002). Globalization and its discontents. New York: W.W. Norton & Company. ISBN 978-0393051247.
- Stiglitz, Joseph; Greenwald, Bruce (2003). Towards a new paradigm in monetary economics. The Raffaele Mattioli Lecture Series. Cambridge, UK and New York: Cambridge University Press. ISBN 978-0521810340.
- Stiglitz, Joseph E. (2003). The roaring nineties: a new history of the world's most prosperous decade. New York: W.W. Norton & Company. ISBN 978-0393058529.
- Stiglitz, Joseph E. (2004). The development round of trade negotiations in the aftermath of Cancún. London, UK: Commonwealth Secretariat. ISBN 978-0850928013.
- Stiglitz, Joseph E.; Charlton, Andrew (2005). Fair trade for all: how trade can promote development. Oxford New York: Oxford University Press. ISBN 978-0199290901.
- Stiglitz, Joseph E.; Walsh, Carl E. (2006). Economics (4th ed.). New York: W.W. Norton & Company. ISBN 978-0393926224.
- Stiglitz, Joseph E.; Walsh, Carl E. (2006). Principles of macroeconomics (4th ed.). New York: W.W. Norton & Company. ISBN 978-0393926248.
- Stiglitz, Joseph E.; Ocampo, José Antonio; Ffrench-Davis, Ricardo; Nayyar, Deepak; Spiegel, Shari (2006). Stability with growth: macroeconomics, liberalization and development. Oxford: Oxford University Press. ISBN 978-0199288144.
- Stiglitz, Joseph E. (2006). Making globalization work. New York: W.W. Norton & Company. ISBN 978-0393061222.
- Stiglitz, Joseph E.; Bilmes, Linda (2008). The three trillion dollar war: the true cost of the Iraq conflict. New York: W.W. Norton & Company. ISBN 978-0393067019.
- Stiglitz, Joseph E.; Ocampo, José Antonio; Griffith-Jones, Stephany (2010). Time for a visible hand: lessons from the 2008 world financial crisis. Oxford New York: Oxford University Press. ISBN 978-0199578818.
- Stiglitz, Joseph E. (2010). The Stiglitz report: reforming the international monetary and financial systems in the wake of the global crisis. New York, New York London: The New Press. ISBN 978-1595585202.
- Stiglitz, Joseph E.; Sen, Amartya; Fitoussi, Jean-Paul (2010). Mismeasuring our lives: why GDP doesn't add up: the report. New York: New Press (Distributed by Perseus Distribution). ISBN 978-1595585196.
- Stiglitz, Joseph (2010). Freefall: America, free markets, and the sinking of the world economy. New York, NY: W.W. Norton & Company. ISBN 978-0393338959.
  - Also as: Stiglitz, Joseph (2010). Freefall: free markets and the sinking of the global economy. London: Penguin. ISBN 978-0141045122.
- Stiglitz, Joseph E. (2012). The Price of Inequality: How Today's Divided Society Endangers Our Future. New York: W.W. Norton & Company. ISBN 978-0393088694.
- Stiglitz, Joseph; Greenwald, Bruce C. (2014). Creating a learning society: a new approach to growth, development, and social progress. New York: Columbia University Press. ISBN 978-0231152143.
- Stiglitz, Joseph E. (2015). The great divide: unequal societies and what we can do about them. New York: W.W. Norton & Company. ISBN 978-0393248579.
- Stiglitz, Joseph E.; Greenwald, Bruce C. (2015). Creating a learning society: a new approach to growth, development, and social progress. Columbia: Columbia University Press. ISBN 978-0231175494.
- Stiglitz, Joseph E. (2016). The Euro: And its Threat to the Future of Europe. Allen Lane. ISBN 978-0241258156.
- Stiglitz, Joseph E. (2019). People, Power and Profits: Progressive Capitalism for an Age of Discontent. Allen Lane. ISBN 978-0241399231.
- Stiglitz, Joseph; Fitoussi, Jean-Paul; Durand, Martine (2019). Measuring What Counts; The Global Movement for Well-Being (Paper ed.). New York: The New Press. ISBN 978-1620975695.
- Stiglitz, Joseph E. (2024). The Road to Freedom: Economics and the Good Society. W.W. Norton & Company. ISBN 978-1324074373.

=== Book chapters ===
- Stiglitz, Joseph E. (1989), "Principal and agent", in Eatwell, John; Milgate, Murray; Newman, Peter K. (eds.), The New Palgrave: allocation, information, and markets, New York: Norton, ISBN 978-0393958546.
- Stiglitz, Joseph E. (1993), "Market socialism and neoclassical economics", in Bardhan, Pranab; Roemer, John E. (eds.), Market socialism: the current debate, New York: Oxford University Press, ISBN 978-0195080490.
- Stiglitz, Joseph E. (2009), "Regulation and failure", in Moss, David A.; Cisternino, John A. (eds.), New perspectives on regulation, Cambridge, Massachusetts: The Tobin Project, pp. 11–23, ISBN 978-0982478806. Pdf version.
- Stiglitz, Joseph E. (2009), "Simple formulae for optional income taxation and the measurement of inequality", in Kanbur, Ravi; Basu, Kaushik (eds.), Arguments for a better world: essays in honor of Amartya Sen | Volume I: Ethics, welfare, and measurement, Oxford New York: Oxford University Press, pp. 535–66, ISBN 978-0199239115.
- Stiglitz, Joseph E.; Bilmes, Linda. (2012), "Estimating the costs of war: Methodological issues, with applications to Iraq and Afghanistan", in Garfinkel, Michelle; Skaperdas, Stergios (eds.), Oxford Handbook of the Economics of Peace and Conflict, Oxford UK: Oxford University Press, pp. 275–317, ISBN 978-0195392777.

=== Selected scholarly articles ===
1970–1979

- Stiglitz, Joseph E.; Rothschild, Michael (September 1970). "Increasing risk: I. a definition". Journal of Economic Theory. 2 (3). Elsevier: 225–43. doi:10.1016/0022-0531(70)90038-4.
- Stiglitz, Joseph E.; Rothschild, Michael (March 1971). "Increasing risk: II. Its economic consequences". Journal of Economic Theory. 3 (1). Elsevier: 66–84. doi:10.1016/0022-0531(71)90034-2.
- Stiglitz, Joseph E. (May 1974). "Alternative theories of wage determination and unemployment in LDC's: the labor turnover model". The Quarterly Journal of Economics. 88 (2). Oxford Journals: 194–227. Bibcode:1974QJEco..88..194S. doi:10.2307/1883069. JSTOR 1883069.
- Stiglitz, Joseph E. (April 1974). "Incentives and risk sharing in sharecropping" (PDF). Review of Economic Studies. 41 (2). Oxford Journals: 219–55. Bibcode:1974RvES...41..219S. doi:10.2307/2296714. JSTOR 2296714. Archived from the original (PDF) on April 27, 2019.
- Stiglitz, Joseph E.; Rothschild, Michael (November 1976). "Equilibrium in competitive insurance markets: an essay on the economics of imperfect information". The Quarterly Journal of Economics. 90 (4). Oxford Journals: 629–49. Bibcode:1976QJEco..90..629R. doi:10.2307/1885326. JSTOR 1885326.
- Stiglitz, Joseph E.; Dixit, Avinash K. (June 1977). "Monopolistic competition and optimum product diversity". The American Economic Review. 67 (3). American Economic Association: 297–308. JSTOR 1831401.
- Stiglitz, Joseph E.; Newbery, David M.G. (December 1979). "The theory of commodity price stabilisation rules: welfare impacts and supply responses". The Economic Journal. 89 (356). Royal Economic Society: 799–817. doi:10.2307/2231500. JSTOR 2231500.

1980–1989

- Grossman, Sanford J.; Stiglitz, Joseph E. (June 1980). "On the Impossibility of Informationally Efficient Markets". The American Economic Review. 70 (3): 393–408. JSTOR 1805228.
- Stiglitz, Joseph E.; Weiss, Andrew (June 1981). "Credit rationing in markets with imperfect information" (PDF). The American Economic Review. 71 (3). American Economic Association: 393–410. JSTOR 1802787. Archived from the original (PDF) on April 10, 2011.
- Stiglitz, Joseph E.; Weiss, Andrew (1983). "Incentive Effects of Terminations: Applications to the Credit and Labor Markets". American Economic Review. 73 (5): 912–927.
- Stiglitz, Joseph E.; Newbery, David M.G. (January 1984). "Pareto inferior trade". Review of Economic Studies. 51 (1). Oxford Journals: 1–12. doi:10.2307/2297701. JSTOR 2297701.
- Stiglitz, Joseph E. (March 1987). "The causes and consequences of the dependence of quality on price". The American Economic Review. 25 (1). American Economic Association: 1–48. JSTOR 2726189.

1990–1999

- Stiglitz, Joseph E.; Greenwald, Bruce (Winter 1993). "New and old Keynesians". Journal of Economic Perspectives. 7 (1). American Economic Association: 23–44. doi:10.1257/jep.7.1.23.
- Stiglitz, Joseph E. (Winter 1993). "Post Walrasian and Post Marxian economics". Journal of Economic Perspectives. 7 (1). American Economic Association: 109–14. doi:10.1257/jep.7.1.109.
- Stiglitz, Joseph E. (August 1996). "Some lessons from the East Asian miracle". World Bank Research Observer. 11 (2). World Bank: 151–77. doi:10.1093/wbro/11.2.151.
- Stiglitz, Joseph E.; Uy, Marilou (August 1996). "Financial markets, public policy, and the East Asian miracle" (PDF). World Bank Research Observer. 11 (2). World Bank: 249–76. doi:10.1093/wbro/11.2.249.
- Stiglitz, Joseph E. (September 1997). "Georgescu-Roegen versus Solow/Stiglitz". Ecological Economics. 22 (3): 269–70. Bibcode:1997EcoEc..22..269S. doi:10.1016/S0921-8009(97)00092-X.
  - See also: Nicholas Georgescu-Roegen and Robert Solow
- Stiglitz, Joseph E. (March 1998). "Redefining the role of the state – What should it do? How should it do it? And how should these decisions be made?". Paper Presented at the Tenth Anniversary of MITI Research Institute, Tokyo. Pdf version.
  - Also as: Stiglitz, Joseph E. (2001). "Redefining the role of the state – What should it do? How should it do it? And how should these decisions be made?". In Chang, Ha-Joon (ed.). Joseph Stiglitz and the World Bank: the rebel within. London: Anthem Press. pp. 94–126. ISBN 978-1898855538.

2000–2009

- Stiglitz, Joseph E. (Spring 1998). "Distinguished lecture on economics in government: the private uses of public interests: incentives and institutions". Journal of Economic Perspectives. 12 (2). American Economic Association: 3–22. doi:10.1257/jep.12.2.3. S2CID 154446858.
- Stiglitz, Joseph E. (May 18, 2007). "Prizes, not patents". Post-Autistic Economics Review. 42. World Economics Association: 48–50.

2010 onwards

- Stiglitz, Joseph E. (May 28, 2014). Reforming taxation to promote growth and equity (PDF) (White Paper). Roosevelt Institute. Archived from the original on June 13, 2014.

=== Articles in popular press ===
- Stiglitz, Joseph E. "Joseph E. Stiglitz". Project Syndicate.
- Stiglitz, Joseph E. (April 17, 2000). "What I learned at the world economic crisis: the insider" (PDF). The New Republic. Chris Hughes.
  - See also: Wade, Robert (January–February 2001). "Showdown at the World Bank". New Left Review. II (7) 2305. New Left Review: 124–37. doi:10.64590/xzs.
- Stiglitz, Joseph E.; Orszag, Peter R.; Orszag, Jonathan M. (March 2, 2002). "Implications of the new Fannie Mae and Freddie Mac risk-based capital standard" (PDF). Fannie Mae Press. I (2). Fannie Mae: 1–10. Archived from the original (PDF) on November 22, 2009.
- Stiglitz, Joseph E. (Fall 2003). "Information and the change in the paradigm in economics, part 1". The American Economist. 47 (2). Omicron Delta Epsilon: 6–26. doi:10.1177/056943450304700202. JSTOR 25604277. S2CID 159272023.
- Stiglitz, Joseph E. (Spring 2004). "Information and the change in the paradigm in economics, part 2". The American Economist. 48 (1). Omicron Delta Epsilon: 17–49. doi:10.1177/056943450404800103. JSTOR 25604291. S2CID 154596039.
- Stiglitz, Joseph E. (December 2007). "The economic consequences of Mr. Bush". Vanity Fair. Condé Nast.
- Stiglitz, Joseph E.; Bilmes, Linda J. (January 2009). "Report: the $10 trillion hangover: paying the price for eight years of Bush". Harper's Magazine. Vol. 318, no. 1904. Harper's Magazine Foundation. Non-subscription version.
- Stiglitz, Joseph E. (January 2009). "Capitalist fools". Vanity Fair. Condé Nast. Archived from the original on January 29, 2015.
- Stiglitz, Joseph (June 12, 2009). "America's socialism for the rich". The Guardian. London.
- Stiglitz, Joseph E. (July 2009). "Wall Street's toxic message". Vanity Fair. Condé Nast.
- Stiglitz, Joseph E. (April 22, 2010). "The Non-Existent Hand". London Review of Books. 32 (8): 17–18.
  - Review of the book: Skidelsky, Robert (2009). Keynes: the return of the master. Allen Lane. ISBN 978-1846142581.
- Stiglitz, Joseph E. (May 2011). "Of the 1%, by the 1%, for the 1%". Vanity Fair. Condé Nast.
- Stiglitz, Joseph E. (July 12, 2011). "The ideological crisis of Western capitalism". Social Europe.
- Stiglitz, Joseph E. (January 2013). "The post-crisis crises". CFO Insight Magazine. Euro Treasurer. Archived from the original on May 4, 2013.
- Stiglitz, Joseph E. (April 2013). "The promise of abenomics". CFO Insight Magazine. Euro Treasurer. Archived from the original on May 4, 2013.
- Stiglitz, Joseph E. (January 2015). "The Chinese Century". Vanity Fair. Condé Nast.
- Stiglitz, Joseph E. (June 29, 2015). "Joseph Stiglitz: how I would vote in the Greek referendum". The Guardian.
- Joseph E. Stiglitz, "Measuring What Matters: Obsession with one financial figure, GDP, has worsened people's health, happiness and the environment, and economists want to replace it", Scientific American, vol. 323, no. 2 (August 2020), pp. 24–31.

=== Video and online sources ===
- Stiglitz, Joseph E. (2007). Committee hearing (via YouTube) (Speech). World Bank & Global Poverty, House Financial Services Committee (C-SPAN). Washington, D.C. Archived from the original on November 7, 2021.
- Stiglitz, Joseph E. (presenter); Sarasin, Jacques (director) (May 2007). "1–5". Where is the world going, Mr. Stiglitz?. New York: First Run Features. Five-part series on two DVD discs.
- Stiglitz, Joseph E. (presenter); Sarasin, Jacques (director) (March 2009). Around the world with Joseph Stiglitz. Arte France / Les Productions Faire Bleu / Swan productions. Archived from the original on October 29, 2014. Original French title Le monde selon Stiglitz.
- Stiglitz, Joseph E.; Bilmes, Linda (February 28, 2008). The three trillion dollar war. Panel discussion regarding their new book. Columbia University.
  - Book details: Stiglitz, Joseph E.; Bilmes, Linda (2008). The three trillion dollar war: the true cost of the Iraq conflict. New York: W.W. Norton & Company. ISBN 978-0393067019.
- Stiglitz, Joseph E. (February 9, 2010). "Bloomberg News" (Video) (YouTube). Interviewed by Andrea Catherwood. "Stiglitz says EU should defend Greece from speculators"
- Stiglitz, Joseph E. (guest); Hendry, Hugh (guest); Casajuana, Carlos (guest) (February 9, 2010). "Newsnight" (Video) (BBC). Interviewed by Emily Maitlis. "What should Europe do about Greece?"
- Stiglitz, Joseph E. (February 9, 2010). "Bloomberg News" (Video) (YouTube). Interviewed by Andrea Catherwood. "Stiglitz says EU should defend Greece from speculators"
- Stiglitz, Joseph E. (August 21, 2014). Inequality, wealth, and growth: why capitalism is failing (Speech). 5th Lindau Meeting on Economic Sciences. Lake Constance, Germany: Lindau Nobel Laureate Meetings.

=== Papers ===
- Online access to Stiglitz's papers, at his own website.

== See also ==
- Atkinson–Stiglitz theorem
- List of economists
- List of Jewish Nobel laureates

Political offices
Preceded by Laura Tyson	Chair of the Council of Economic Advisers; 1995–1997	Succeeded by Janet Yellen
Diplomatic posts
Preceded by Michael Bruno	Chief Economist of the World Bank; 1997–2000	Succeeded by Nicholas Stern
Awards
Preceded by James J. Heckman; Daniel L. McFadden	Laureate of the Nobel Memorial Prize in Economics; 2001; Served alongside: George A. Akerlof, A. Michael Spence	Succeeded by Daniel Kahneman; Vernon L. Smith
