= Comparisons between the Great Recession and the Great Depression =

Comparisons between the Great Recession and the Great Depression explores the experiences in the United States and the United Kingdom.

On April 17, 2009, head of the IMF Dominique Strauss-Kahn said that there was a chance that certain countries may not implement the proper policies to avoid feedback mechanisms that could eventually turn the recession into a depression. "The free-fall in the global economy may be starting to abate, with a recovery emerging in 2010, but this depends crucially on the right policies being adopted today." The IMF pointed out that unlike the Great Depression, this recession was synchronized by global integration of markets. Such synchronized recessions were explained to last longer than typical economic downturns and have slower recoveries.

The chief economist of the IMF, Dr. Olivier Blanchard, stated that the percentage of workers laid off for long stints has been rising with each downturn for decades but the figures have surged this time. "Long-term unemployment is alarmingly high: in the US, half the unemployed have been out of work for over six months, something we have not seen since the Great Depression." The IMF also stated that a link between rising inequality within Western economies and deflating demand may exist. The last time that the wealth gap reached such skewed extremes was in 1928–1929.

== In the United States ==
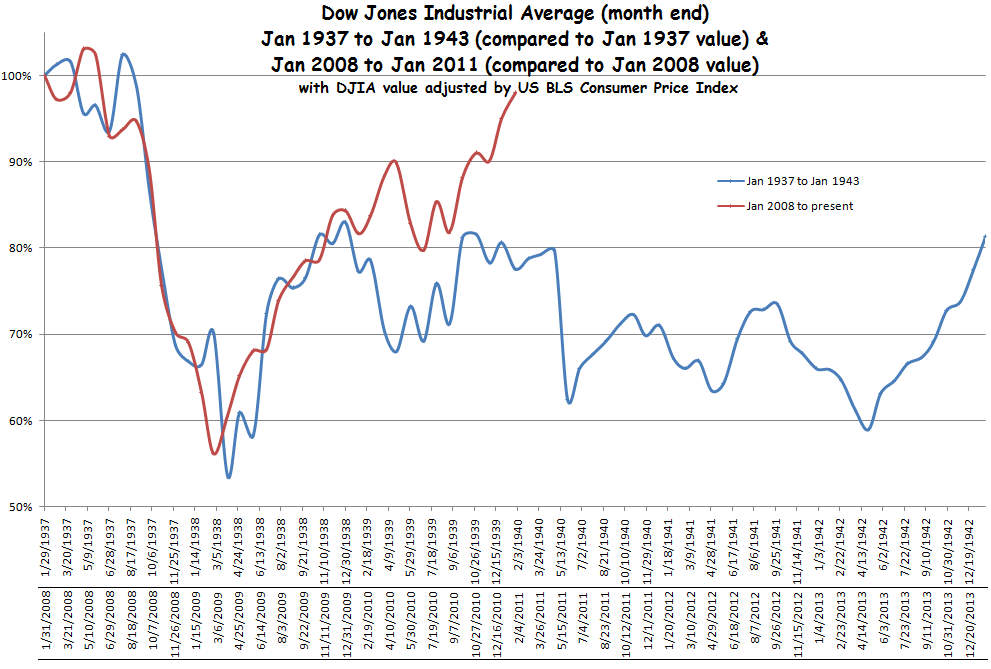
Dow Jones Industrial Average figures for percentage lost in 1937–1943 vs 2008–2011 (based on initial 1937 and 2008 DJIA month end amount, respectively)

Although some casual comparisons between the Great Recession and the Great Depression have been made, there remain large differences between the two events. Actually, if the magnitude of initial shocks was the same in both cases, the recovery from the latest one would be earlier. The consensus among economists in March 2009 was that a depression was not likely to occur. UCLA Anderson Forecast director Edward Leamer said on March 25, 2009 that there had not been any major predictions at that time which resembled a second Great Depression:

"We've frightened consumers to the point where they imagine there is a good prospect of a Great Depression. That certainly is not in the prospect. No reputable forecaster is producing anything like a Great Depression."

Differences explicitly pointed out between the recession and the Great Depression include the facts that over the 79 years between 1929 and 2008, great changes occurred in economic philosophy and policy, the stock market had not fallen as far as it did in 1932 or 1982, the 10-year price-to-earnings ratio of stocks was not as low as in the 1930s or 1980s, inflation-adjusted U.S. housing prices in March 2009 were higher than any time since 1890 (including the housing booms of the 1970s and 1980s), the recession of the early 1930s lasted over three-and-a-half years, and during the 1930s the supply of money (currency plus demand deposits) fell by 25% (where as in 2008 and 2009 the Fed "has taken an ultraloose credit stance"). Furthermore, the unemployment rate in 2008 and early 2009 and the rate at which it rose was comparable to most of the recessions occurring after World War II, and was dwarfed by the 25% unemployment rate peak of the Great Depression. However, syndicated columnist and former Assistant Secretary of the Treasury Paul Craig Roberts claimed in a 2012 column that if all discouraged workers were included in U.S. unemployment statistics, the actual unemployment rate would be 22%, comparable to rates during the Great Depression.

Nobel Prize–winning economist Paul Krugman predicted a series of depressions in his The Return of Depression Economics (1999), based on "failures on the demand side of the economy." On January 5, 2009, he wrote that "preventing depressions isn't that easy after all" and that "the economy is still in free fall." In March 2009, Krugman explained that a major difference in this situation is that the causes of this financial crisis were from the shadow banking system. "The crisis hasn't involved problems with deregulated institutions that took new risks... Instead, it involved risks taken by institutions that were never regulated in the first place."

On February 22, 2009, NYU economics professor Nouriel Roubini said that the crisis was the worst since the Great Depression, and that without cooperation between political parties and foreign countries, and if poor fiscal policy decisions (such as support of zombie banks) are pursued, the situation "could become as bad as the Great Depression." On April 27, 2009, Roubini expressed a more upbeat assessment by noting that "the bottom of the economy [will be seen] toward the beginning or middle of next year."

On April 6, 2009 Vernon L. Smith and Steven Gjerstad offered the hypothesis "that a financial crisis that originates in consumer debt, especially consumer debt concentrated at the low end of the wealth and income distribution, can be transmitted quickly and forcefully into the financial system. It appears that we're witnessing the second great consumer debt crash, the end of a massive consumption binge."

In his final press conference as president, George W. Bush claimed that in September 2008 his chief economic advisors had said that the economic situation could at some point become worse than the Great Depression.

A tent city in Sacramento, California was described as "images, hauntingly reminiscent of the iconic photos of the 1930s and the Great Depression" and "evocative Depression-era images."

According to economist Irving Fisher, the two dominant factors in a depression are over-indebtness to start with and deflation soon after. Fed policy to prevent deflation at all costs has been greatly influenced by Fisher's work.

== In the United Kingdom ==
On 10 February 2009, Ed Balls, Secretary of State for Children, Schools and Families of the United Kingdom, said that "I think that this is a financial crisis more extreme and more serious than that of the 1930s and we all remember how the politics of that era were shaped by the economy." On 24 January 2009, Edmund Conway, Economics Editor for The Daily Telegraph, had written that "The plight facing Britain is uncannily similar to the 1930s, since prices of many assets – from shares to house prices – are falling at record rates [in Britain], but the value of the debt against which they are held remains unchanged."
