= Daniel T. Griswold =

Director of the Cato Institute

Daniel "Dan" T. Griswold (born 1958) is a senior research Fellow and co-director of the Program on the American Economy and Globalization at the Mercatus Center at George Mason University.

Griswold was previously the president of the National Association of Foreign-Trade Zones, an organization based in Washington DC. Prior to NAFTZ, he served as the director of the Cato Institute's Center for Trade Policy Studies, where he authored numerous studies on trade and immigration policy. Before joining Cato in 1997, Griswold served as press secretary for Congressman Vin Weber of Minnesota, and later for 12 years as editorial page editor of the Colorado Springs Gazette-Telegraph.

He has written for major newspapers such as The Wall Street Journal and the Los Angeles Times, appeared on CNN, PBS, C-SPAN and other national TV and radio networks, and testified before congressional committees. He was born in a small Midwestern town, graduated from the University of Wisconsin–Madison with a bachelor's degree in journalism and economics, and received a master's degree in the Politics of the World Economy from the London School of Economics. Griswold has written extensively on such subjects as immigration reform and the U.S. balance of trade. He also authored the book Mad about Trade: Why Main Street America Should Embrace Globalization, published in 2009. He lives with his wife, Elizabeth, in Northern Virginia.

== Major views ==
Writing from a conservative Christian perspective, Griswold criticizes United States sanctions on the humanitarian grounds that sanctions limit the possibilities of a sanctioned country's people to exercise political liberties and practice market freedom.
