= Jean-Paul Fitoussi =

French economist (1942–2022)

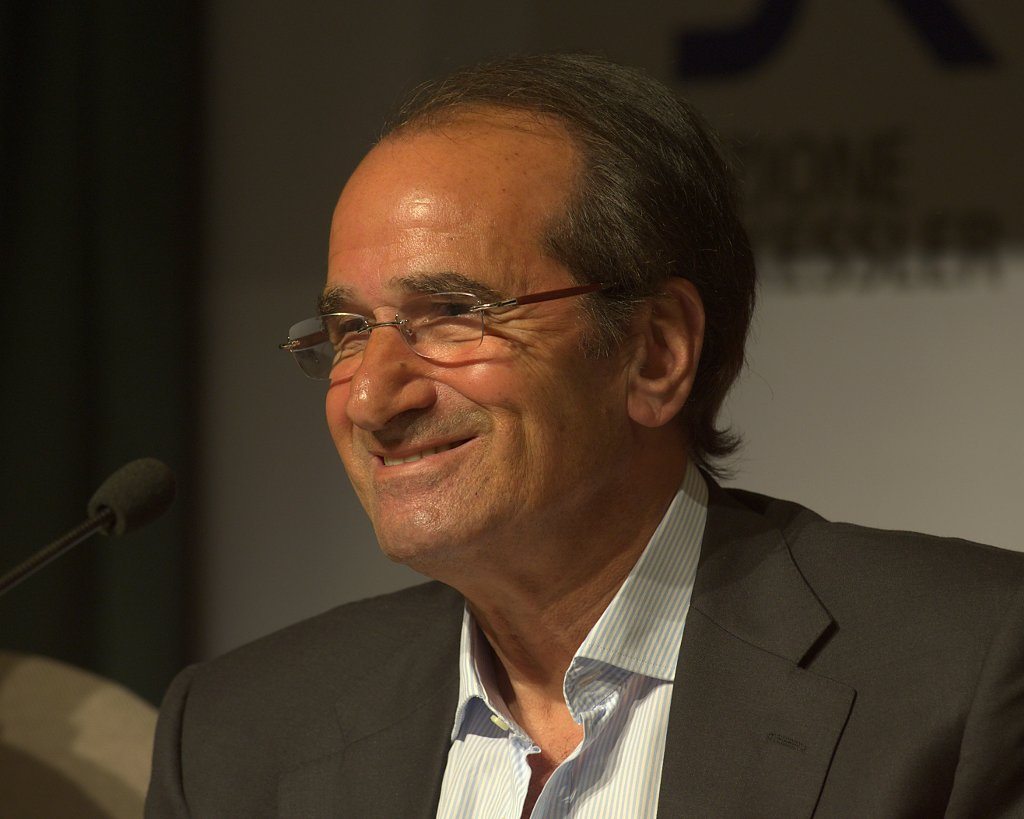
- Fitoussi on Festival dell'Economia di Trento, 2009.
- Born: 19 August 1942; La Goulette, French Protectorate of Tunisia, France
- Died: 15 April 2022 (aged 79); Paris, France

Academic background
- Education: University of Strasbourg
- Influences: Paul Chamley; Paul Coulbois

Academic work
- Discipline: Political economics Macroeconomics
- Institutions: Institut d'études politiques de Paris
- Website: Information at IDEAS / RePEc

Jean-Paul Fitoussi (19 August 1942 – 15 April 2022) was a French economist and sociologist of Sephardi Jewish descent.

== Biography ==
Born in La Goulette, French Protectorate of Tunisia, Fitoussi earned his Ph.D. cum laude in Law and Economics from the University of Strasbourg. From 1979 until 1983, he was a professor at the European University Institute in Florence, and a visiting professor at the University of California, Los Angeles, in 1984. He was a professor of economics at the Institut d'études politiques de Paris, where he taught since 1982. He was also professor emeritus at LUISS "Guido Carli" University, in Rome. From 1989 to 2010 he served as President of the Observatoire Français des Conjonctures Économiques, a center dedicated to economic research and forecasting. He published numerous articles, books and essays. He is considered to be one of the intellectual leaders of neo-keynesianism of these past 40 years, but claims to have a "very heterodox" vision.

In 2012 was published his book Macroeconomic Theory And Economic Policy: Essays in Honour of Jean-Paul Fitoussi. Edited by Vela Velupillai, it contained contributions from Nobel Prize winning economists Kenneth Arrow, Jean Tirole & Robert Solow as well as Olivier Blanchard & Edmond Malinvaud. In 2014 was published Fruitful Economics, Papers in honor of and by Jean-Paul Fitoussi. The book is divided in five chapters, written respectively by Kenneth Arrow, Joseph Stiglitz, Edmund Phelps, Robert Solow, and Amartya Sen, all of whom worked with Jean Paul Fitoussi at different points in their lives.

From 2000 to 2009 he was an expert at the European Parliament, Commission of Monetary and Economic Affairs. He was also a member of the "Centre for Capitalism and Society" at Columbia University, and a member of the Economic Commission of the Nation since 1997. From 2008 to 2009, he was a member of the UN Commission on the Reform of the International Monetary and Financial System and coordinator of the Commission on the Measurement of Economic Performance and Social Progress.

In 2013, Sciences Po, a leading French university, set up a day in celebration of Dr. Fitoussi's career, uniting him with economists Joseph Stiglitz, Edmund Phelps, Kenneth Arrow, Robert Solow and Amartya Sen, to debate on the major "fitoussian" issues: European integration, inequality, well‐being and environmental sustainability, and the European democratic deficit. The event was concluded by speeches from then French minister of foreign affairs Laurent Fabius and by French president Francois Hollande.

Fitoussi has received the "Association Français de Sciences Économiques Prix" (French Association for Economic Sciences Award), and the "Rossi Award" from the "Académie des Sciences Morales et Politiques" (Academy of Moral and Political Sciences). He has been also awarded various honours, including the honorary deanship of the Faculty of Economics in Strasbourg University, Honoris Causa degree at the Buenos Aires University, and in his own country with the decorations of "Chevalier de l'Ordre National du Mérite" (Knight of the National Order of Merit) and "Chevalier de la Legion d'Honneur" (Knight of the Legion of Honour). He is also Officer of the "Order of Prince Henry of Portugal".

In 2017, he declared his support for presidential candidate Emmanuel Macron. As of September 2020, Fitoussi was a member of the Italian Aspen Institute.

== Selected publications ==
- Fitoussi, Jean-Paul; Malinvaud, Edmond (1980). Macroeconomic Rationing of Employment. Malinvaud and Fitoussi, Unemployment in Western Countries.
- Fitoussi, Jean-Paul; Phelps, Edmund.S (1988). The Slump in Europe: Open Economy Theory Reconstructed. Basil Blackwell. ISBN 978-0-631-15557-7.
- Fitoussi, Jean-Paul; Blanchard, Olivier; Atkinson, Tony.; Solow, Robert; Phelps, Edmund.s (1993). Competitive Disinflation: The Mark and Budgetary Politics in Europe. Oxford University Press. ISBN 978-0-19-877363-4.
- Fitoussi, Jean-Paul; Bhagwati, Jagdish; Varsavsky, Martin . (2003). Economia.
- Fitoussi, Jean-Paul (2004). La démocratie et le marché. Grasset.
- Fitoussi, Jean-Paul; Stiglitz, Joseph (2009), The Ways Out of the Crisis and the Building of a More Cohesive World
- Fitoussi, Jean-Paul; Phelps, Edmund.S; Pissarides, Christopher (2010). After the Crisis, the Way Ahead. Luiss University Press.
- Fitoussi, Jean-Paul; Sen, Amartya; Stiglitz, Joseph.E (2010). Mismeasuring our lives: why GDP doesn't add up: the report. New York: New Press Distributed by Perseus Distribution. ISBN 978-1-59558-519-6.
- Fitoussi, Jean-Paul; Stiglitz, Joseph (2011), The G20 and recovery and beyond : an agenda for global governance for the twenty-first century
- Fitoussi, Jean-Paul (2013). Le théorème du lampadaire. Les liens qui libèrent.
- ———; Saraceno, Francesco (2008), "Fiscal Discipline as a Social Norm: The European Stability Pact" (PDF), Journal of Public Economic Theory, 10 (6): 1143–1168, doi:10.1111/j.1467-9779.2008.00400.x
- ——— (1994), "Wage Distribution and Unemployment: The French Experience", American Economic Review, 84 (2): 59–64, JSTOR 2117802
- ———; Le Cacheux, Jacques (1988), "On Macroeconomic Implications of Price Setting in the Open Economy", American Economic Review, 78 (2): 335–340, JSTOR 1818146
