= Period of financial distress =

A period of financial distress occurs when the price of a company or an asset or an index of a set of assets in a market is declining with the danger of a sudden crash of value occurring, either because the company is experiencing increasing problems of cash flow or a deteriorating credit balance or because the price had become too high as a result of a speculative bubble that has now peaked.

== Background ==
It is not known when this phrase was first used or by whom. However, it or phrases closely equivalent were almost certainly first used in connection with the theory of value investing as developed initially by Benjamin Graham in his famous book Security Analysis (Graham and Dodd, 1934). This theory advocated long-term investing in stocks or assets that are underpriced compared to their intrinsic value, that is they have suffered “distress sales” and the stock or asset of company is going through a “period of financial distress.” If such a period is temporary, and the company can be expected to return to an improved condition of normal solvency, then investing in such an asset can be expected to outperform the stock market in general in the longer run. In connection with this Graham developed the Benjamin Graham formula, also known as “net current asset value.” A similar analysis was done by John Burr Williams who developed his discounted cash flow theory (Williams, 1938). A prominent advocate of Graham and his approach has been Warren Buffett, who has claimed that he is an “85% Graham investor” (Buffett, 2003).

This approach has been criticized by advocates of modern portfolio theory (MPT) and the closely related doctrine of the efficient-market hypothesis (EMH) most closely associated with Eugene Fama (Fama, 1970). These theories argue that if a stock or asset is selling at what appears to be a “distress value” compared to some estimate of its true value based on its current income flows, then the market has information about the expected future of the company or asset that is not reflected in its current income flow. In this regard, investors such as Buffett who have successfully used the Graham approach should expect to spend extra resources to have better information about the companies or assets they purchase compared to most agents in the market. A study that shows that the Graham approach may well do better than various other alternatives (such as the “three-factor theory” that Fama and French, 1996, have argued performs better than the EMH), is Xiao and Arnold (2008).

== Use in forecasting corporate bankruptcies ==
Another use of this phrase has been in connection with efforts to predict corporate bankruptcies that may come out of such a period of financial distress. One who developed an approach to making such predictions has been Edward Altman, who developed the z-score financial analysis tool (Altman, 1968). Further study of this and related tools has been done by Altman and Hotchkiss (2005). This idea can be related to the earlier issue in that presumably why the Graham approach might not do as well as such alternatives as MPT or EMH is that it does not satisfactorily account for the risk of such bankruptcies. Again, it is clear that to outperform such models a Graham-style investor will have to have sufficiently good information about such possibilities to know whether or not such a threat can be discounted.

== Use in analysis of speculative bubbles and crashes ==
Drawing on these uses from corporate finance, Hyman Minsky applied the phrase to analyzing speculative bubbles and crashes (Minsky, 1972), using it to characterize a period in a speculative bubble that follows a peak in price, in which the price gradually declines, and which is then followed by a crash in which the price falls precipitously. This analysis was adopted by Charles P. Kindleberger, who in Appendix B of the 4th edition of his book, Manias, Panics, and Crashes (2000) identified 37 out of 47 historical bubbles as exhibiting such a pattern, including most of the more famous ones. Although the phrase was not used, participants in periods of financial distress in early bubbles used a variety of colorful terms and phrases for them, such as "apprehension" or "an ugly drop in the market" during the South Sea bubble in Britain in 1720 (Carswell, 1960, p. 139). Arguably the recent global bubble in financial derivatives exhibited this pattern, with a peak in August 2007, followed by a crash in September 2008. The first to develop a mathematical model of this period of financial distress was J. Barkley Rosser, Jr. (Chapter 5, 1991), drawing on catastrophe theory, while a more detailed such model using agent-based modeling and relying on the wealth constraint idea due to Minsky has been done by Gallegati, Palestrini, and Rosser (2011.)
