= Charles Brandes =

American businessman

- Born: 1942 or 1943 (age 83–84); Pittsburgh, Pennsylvania
- Citizenship: United States
- Education: Bucknell University; San Diego State University
- Occupations: Businessman, investor, philanthropist
- Employer: Brandes Investment Partners
- Known for: Manager of Brandes Investment Partners
- Spouses: Linda King Formo (1986-2004); Tanya Johnson (2006-2018)
- Children: 2

Charles H. Brandes is an American investor, businessman, and philanthropist. He is a disciple of the Benjamin Graham school of value investing. Brandes Investment Partners, which was started in 1974, currently has over $39.8 billion under management (down from over $111 billion in 2007) and is based in San Diego, California. In the Forbes 400 Richest Americans publication for 2007, Brandes ranked 165.

According to Forbes, Brandes was worth over $1 billion as of January 2018.

== Early life and education ==
Brandes grew up in Pittsburgh. In 1965, he graduated from Bucknell University with a bachelor's degree in economics. He did graduate studies at San Diego State University.

Brandes is a CFA charterholder. Brandes met Ben Graham in San Diego while he was training to be a stockbroker. He was able to learn firsthand the techniques Graham used to determine undervalued investment securities.

== Career ==
As of 2007, Brandes' U.S. Value Equity fund has beaten the S&P 500 index for the past 5, 10 and 15 years. According to the book Investment Leadership, Brandes' Global equity fund had an average return of 19.21% over the prior 20 years. Brandes Investments strictly follows Graham and Dodd principles as outlined in the books Security Analysis and The Intelligent Investor. Also recently, the firm made investments in the troubled mortgage and financial sectors, paying bargain prices for investments in Countrywide Financial, Washington Mutual, Wachovia. and Bank of America. Brandes is among the largest institutional shareholder of Royal Bank of Scotland and General Motors. Thomson Financial's well-regarded Nelson's World's Best Money Managers rankings consistently lists Brandes Investment Partners among the Top 10 International Equity Fund Managers in the world.

Brandes' adherence to Graham and Dodd principles has extended to investment research. He commissioned a study to investigate the "Falling Knives" strategy, the investment axiom that catching falling knives (a stock whose price has been dropping precipitously) is like catching falling money (likely to lead to losses). Researching 1,000 companies between 1986 and 2002 whose price had fallen 60% over a twelve-month period, the study found that within three years of the decline 13% of the companies went bankrupt, but despite this that the portfolio as a whole gained in value by 18% over three years. Announced departure from the firm effect February 26, 2018. Brandes published a well-received book on his investment strategies in 2003 titled Value Investing Today.

== Philanthropy ==
The Tanya and Charles Brandes Foundation funded a scholarship program at San Diego Jewish Academy's Maimonides Upper School.

== Personal life ==
Brandes has been married four times:

- In 1986, he married his second wife Linda King Formo (born 1948). They divorced in 2004. They did not have children.
- in 2006, he married Tanya Johnson; in 2018 the couple announced that they were divorcing citing mutual domestic violence as one of the causes. He lives in San Diego County in Rancho Santa Fe on 30 Acres.
- in 2020 he was married in a private ceremony over Zoom, the couple celebrated September 9, 2021 in a public ceremony with friends and family.

== See also ==
- Value Investing
- Benjamin Graham
- David Dodd
- William J. Ruane
- Irving Kahn
