= Tweedy, Browne =

American investment advisory and fund management firm

- Industry: Investment advisory and fund management firm
- Founded: 1920
- Headquarters: Stamford, Connecticut, United States

Tweedy, Browne Company LLC is an American investment advisory and fund management firm founded in 1920 and headquartered in Stamford, Connecticut. As of December 2012, it managed approximately 13 billion dollars in separate accounts and four mutual funds. The firm specialized in value investing influenced by Benjamin Graham, and is also known for their association with Warren Buffett during the early phase of his career. Tweedy, Browne has been described as "the oldest value investing firm on Wall Street".

== History ==
The company was started in 1920 by Forest Berwind "Bill" Tweedy, who initially focused on shares of smaller companies, often family owned, that traded in lower numbers and lower volume than larger company stocks. This niche allowed him to buy stocks at a significant discount to estimated book value due to the limited options for sellers. Tweedy's focus on buying shares at a discount caught the attention of Benjamin Graham, the father of value investing who was in the 1920s and '30s formalizing his theories. Tweedy and Graham eventually became friends and worked out of the same New York City office building at 52 Broadway.

After decades working solo, Tweedy was joined by Howard Browne and Joe Reilly in 1945, when the firm's name became Tweedy, Browne & Reilly. Walter Schloss had a close friendship with Tweedy and used a desk in their office, but Schloss never officially worked at Tweedy, Browne. Bill Tweedy retired in 1957, and Howard Browne became president of the company. They still focused on being a market maker or broker-dealer for smaller companies at this point, and became known as "buyers of last resort" for stocks neglected by larger trading firms, which often meant buying stocks at bargain prices.

Warren Buffett, a protégé of Graham, was closely linked with Tweedy, Browne in the early stages of his investing career. He used Tweedy, Browne as his preferred brokerage for Buffet Partnership, Ltd. (1956-1966), and bought his first shares of Berkshire Hathaway through the firm.

By the 1960s, Tweedy, Browne had expanded from a brokerage and market maker to managing money for outside investors. Buffett singled out Tweedy, Browne as superior investors in his 1984 article "The Superinvestors of Graham-and-Doddsville," noting they outperformed both the Dow Jones Industrial Average and S&P 500 by substantial margins from 1966 to 1982. Their first mutual fund open to the general public was created in 1993.

In 1997 the holding company Affiliated Managers Group bought 70% of Tweedy, Browne for $300 million.

The firm's managing directors included well-known value investor Christopher H. Browne, Howard Browne's son and author of The Little Book of Value Investing (2007). Christoper Browne died on December 13, 2009. During Christopher Browne's tenure, two of the firm's mutual funds outperformed market averages between 1993 and 2009. In 2003, Christopher Browne was the first to publicly speak up about irregularities in Conrad Black's management of Hollinger, of which Tweedy, Browne owned a substantial minority of stock, reporting Black to the Securities and Exchange Commission. Black was forced out later that year and ultimately convicted of fraud.

In late 2024, Tweedy, Browne launched their first exchange traded fund (ETF), using their value-focused methods and also emphasizing companies globally whose executives are engaged in significant buying of their own company's stock. The ETF is strongly influenced by the work of H. Nejat Seyhun, a professor of finance at the University of Michigan. A second ETF followed in 2025, using similar strategies but focused entirely on companies outside the United States. Both ETFs are intended to have minimal overlap with their existing mutual funds.

The managers of Tweedy, Browne also published a number of freely available papers about investment strategies.

== Investing philosophy ==
All of the firm's funds are managed in accordance to the principles of Value Investing as popularized by Benjamin Graham. Tweedy became acquainted with Graham in the early 1930s.

In a 1992 paper, Tweedy, Browne outlined the five characteristics they use to identify stocks for possible investment. (1) Low price to book value; (2) low price to earnings ratio; (3) significant stock purchases by executive officers at a company, particularly when stock price drops, indicating insiders have confidence in long-term company prospects; (4) significant drop in stock price; (5) small market capitalization. While these traits do not guarantee a positive outcome, the firm cites academic research from around the world to indicate these traits may increase the odds of investing success when consistently applied over time.

The firm also has published data in 2007, updated in 2014, citing academic and professional research showing stocks from quality companies with high dividend yields tend to have superior long-term performance. Tweedy, Browne argues dividends are an important driver of long-term equity returns and also believes portfolios of higher-yielding stocks have historically produced attractive total returns compared with lower-yielding stocks and the broader market. High, sustainable dividend yields can also provide a degree of protection during market downturns, and reinvesting dividends can help investors recover losses more quickly. The ability to consistently pay cash dividends may also provide evidence of underlying business health in a more objectively measurable manner than earnings statements, which can be potentially manipulated by the complexity of Financial accounting and occasional cases of fraud.
