= The Warren Buffett Way =

Book by Kenneth Fisher

- The third edition cover
- Author: Robert Hagstrom
- Language: English
- Subject: Business, investing
- Publisher: John Wiley & Sons, Inc
- Publication date: 12 November 2004 - 2nd edition
- Publication place: United States
- ISBN: 978-0-471-64811-6
- OCLC: 55800704
- Dewey Decimal: 332.6 22
- LC Class: HG172.B84 H34 2005

The Warren Buffett Way, a book by author Robert Hagstrom, which outlines the business and investment principles of value investing practiced by American businessman and investor Warren Buffett.

== Accolades ==
The first edition, published in 1994, sold over a million copies and spent 21 weeks on the New York Times Hardcover Nonfiction Best Seller list. A decade later, Hagstrom issued a second, expanded edition.

== Chapters ==
1. The world's greatest investor
2. The education of warren buffett
3. "Our main business is insurance": The early days of berkshire hathaway
4. Buying a business
5. Investing guidelines: business tenets
6. Investing guidelines: management tenets
7. Investing guidelines: financial tenets
8. Investing guidelines: value tenets
9. Investing in fixed-income securities
10. Managing your portfolio
11. The psychology of money
12. The unreasonable man

== Principles ==
The principles included:

1. Purchase businesses with excellent long-term prospects
2. Purchase businesses at a large discount to their intrinsic value
3. Purchase businesses with a high return on invested capital
4. Purchase businesses with honest managers

== See more ==
- Look-through earnings
- Phil Town
- Charlie Munger
- Warren Buffett
- Benjamin Graham
- The Snowball: Warren Buffett and the Business of Life
- Security Analysis (book)
- The Intelligent Investor
- Value investing
