= Margin of Safety (book) =

1991 book by Seth Klarman

Margin of Safety: Risk-Averse Value Investing Strategies for the Thoughtful Investor
- Author: Seth Klarman
- Language: English
- Subject: Securities, Investment
- Publisher: HarperCollins
- Publication date: 1991
- Publication place: United States
- Pages: 249
- ISBN: 978-0887305108
- OCLC: 2248345232

Margin of Safety: Risk-averse Value Investing Strategies for the Thoughtful Investor is a 1991 book written by American investor Seth Klarman, manager of the Baupost Group hedge fund. The book discusses Klarman's views about value investing, temperance, valuation, and portfolio management, among other topics. Klarman draws from the earlier investment book The Intelligent Investor, chapter 20 of which is titled "Margin of Safety". The term describes a concept formulated in the 1940s by authors Benjamin Graham and David Dodd.

== History ==
In 1991, when Seth Klarman was 34 years old, he published Margin of Safety with the publisher HarperCollins. The book initially sold just 5,000 copies for $25 a piece and was considered a "flop."

In a 2017 interview with Charlie Rose, Klarman considered re-issuing a limited edition copy of Margin of Safety with proceeds going to charity but was otherwise not interested in reviving the book.

On July 6, 2018, a Kindle edition of the book was quietly released to the Amazon website. Within a matter of days, the non-authorized kindle edition of the book went to the #16 spot of "business and investment" section of the online bookstore. Baupost Group responded to the illegal copy by saying "The Kindle version of Margin of Safety: Risk-Averse Value Investing Strategies for the Thoughtful Investor on Amazon is an unauthorized version being sold in violation of its registered copyright, which is owned by Seth Klarman. Mr. Klarman has not authorized republication of Margin of Safety, electronically or in any other format. Our legal department is taking and will continue to take appropriate action with respect to this matter."

== Reception and impact ==
Despite the initial flop, over time the book has achieved "cultlike" status amongst the value investing community and has been revered as a "bible" of sorts. This has caused physical copies of the book to be worth from $500-$2,500 a piece. The high price of the book has resulted in piracy.

The book has featured in a number of recommended reading lists in the investment press.

== See also ==
- Margin of safety (financial)
- Value investing
