= Jason Zweig =

American journalist and columnist

- Education: Columbia University (BA)
- Occupations: Journalist, columnist
- Organization: The Wall Street Journal
- Awards: Gerald Loeb Award for Personal Finance (2011)

Jason Zweig is an American financial journalist. He has been a columnist for The Wall Street Journal since 2008.

== Biography ==
Zweig received his B.A. from Columbia University in 1982. He also studied Middle Eastern history and culture at the Hebrew University of Jerusalem.

Zweig began his career in journalism working for the bimonthly journal The Africa Report. He then joined Time magazine's business section and became a business journalist for Forbes magazine, later becoming its mutual funds editor. He joined Money magazine in 1995 and was a guest columnist for Time magazine and CNN.com. He became a personal finance columnist for The Wall Street Journal in 2008.

Zweig edited a revised version of Benjamin Graham's The Intelligent Investor, published in 2003. His other books include Your Money and Your Brain (2007), a book on the neuroscience of investing and behavioral finance, and The Devil's Financial Dictionary (2015), a satirical glossary of financial terms.

Zweig won a 2013 Gerald Loeb Award for Personal Finance and Personal Service for his column, "The Intelligent Investor," in The Wall Street Journal. He also received the 40th Elliot V. Bell Award from the New York Financial Writers Association in 2020 for an "outstanding journalist for a significant long-term contribution to the profession of financial journalism." He was also a past trustee of the Museum of American Finance.

== See also ==
- Benjamin Graham
- Benjamin Graham formula
- The Intelligent Investor
- Value Investing
- Warren Buffett
- Finance
