= Net current asset value =

Financial metric

The net current asset value (NCAV) is a financial metric popularized by Benjamin Graham in his 1934 book Security Analysis. NCAV is calculated by subtracting a company's total liabilities from its current assets. Graham suggested a value investing strategy of buying a well-diversified portfolio of stocks that have a net current asset value greater than their market cap. This strategy is sometimes referred to as "cigar-butt" investing, because it tends to focus on struggling companies that are trading below their liquidation value.

== Methodology ==
A company's net current asset value (NCAV) can be calculated as:

Net Current Asset Value (NCAV) = Total Current Assets - Total Liabilities

And a company's market cap is calculated as:

Market Capitalization (MC) = Number of Shares Outstanding × Current Price per share 

If NCAV > MC then the stock is considered undervalued.

== Historical returns ==
=== United States stock market returns ===
A 1986 study found that a Ben Graham-style NCAV investing strategy outperformed the benchmark from 1971 to 1983. The NCAV strategy produced a return of 33.7% compared to 12.1% for the benchmark.

A 2014 study found that the NCAV strategy produced an annualized geometric return of 24.7% from 2003 to 2010; the excess returns were unexplainable by either the capital asset pricing model or the Fama-French-Carhart model.

=== International stock market returns ===
A 1993 study found that the NCAV strategy in Japanese stocks produced a return of 19.7% compared to 16.6% for the relevant benchmark from 1975 to 1988. A 2008 study found that the NCAV strategy on the London Stock Exchange produced a mean annualized return of 31.1% compared to 20.5% for the relevant benchmark between 1980 and 2005.
