= Walter Schloss =

American Investor, fund manager, and philanthropist (1916–2012)

Walter Jerome Schloss
- Born: August 28, 1916; Manhattan, New York City
- Died: February 19, 2012 (aged 95); New York, New York, U.S.
- Occupations: Investor, fund manager, and philanthropist
- Known for: Working for Benjamin Graham; Investment record of annualized 15% gains Founding Walter & Edwin Schloss Associates
- Website: www.walterschloss.com

Walter Jerome Schloss (August 28, 1916 – February 19, 2012) was an American investor, fund manager, and philanthropist. He was a well-regarded value investor as well as a notable disciple of the Benjamin Graham school of investing. He died of leukemia at the age of 95.

== Biography ==
Schloss did not attend college. In 1934 at the age of 18, he started work as a runner on Wall Street. Schloss took investment courses taught by Graham at the New York Stock Exchange Institute while being employed at Loeb, Rhoades & Co. One of his classmates was Gus Levy, the future chairman of Goldman Sachs. He eventually went to work for Graham in the Graham-Newman Partnership.

In 1955, Schloss left Graham's company and started his own investment firm, eventually managing money for 92 investors. Due in part to his maintaining a manageable asset size, Schloss averaged a 15.3% compound return over the course of four and a half decades, versus 10% for the S&P 500. Between 1956 and 1984, the WJS Partnership's annual compounded rate was 21.3% (16.1% for the limited partners).

Schloss closed out his fund in 2000 and stopped actively managing others' money in 2003.

He served four years in the U.S. Army during World War II.

Warren Buffett named him as one of The Superinvestors of Graham-and-Doddsville, who disproved the academic position that the market is efficient, and that beating the S&P 500 was "pure chance".

Warren Buffett had this to say about Schloss:

He knows how to identify securities that sell at considerably less than their value to a private owner: And that's all he does... He owns many more stocks than I do and is far less interested in the underlying nature of the business; I don't seem to have very much influence on Walter. That is one of his strengths; no one has much influence on him.

== Philanthropy ==
Schloss was the Treasurer for Freedom House, and was a patron of the Tenement Museum. His archive is held at Columbia University.

== See also ==
- Value Investing
- David Dodd
- The Intelligent Investor
- Security Analysis (book)
- Warren Buffett
- Irving Kahn
