= The Superinvestors of Graham-and-Doddsville =

1984 article by Warren Buffett

"The Superinvestors of Graham-and-Doddsville" is an article by Warren Buffett promoting value investing, published in the Fall, 1984 issue of Hermes, Columbia Business School magazine. It was based on a speech given on May 17, 1984, at the Columbia University School of Business in honor of the 50th anniversary of the publication of Benjamin Graham and David Dodd's book Security Analysis. The speech and article challenged the idea that equity markets are efficient through a study of nine successful investment funds generating long-term returns above the market index. All these funds were managed by Benjamin Graham's alumni, following the same "Graham-and-Doddsville" value investing strategy but each investing in different assets and stocks.

== The speech ==
Columbia Business School arranged celebration of Graham–Dodd's jubilee as a contest between Michael Jensen, a University of Rochester professor and a proponent of the efficient-market hypothesis, and Buffett, who was known to oppose it.

Jensen proposed a thought experiment: if a large group of people flipped coins and predicted if the coins would land heads or tails, over time, a small number of participants would correctly predict the outcome of a lengthy series of flips through random chance or luck rather than any skill. Jensen used the coin-flipping as a parallel for the fact that most active investors tend to under-perform the stock market, further arguing that the small number of investors who regularly beat the averages are doing so by luck or random chance rather than by applying any analysis or strategy to their investing decisions.

Buffett grabbed Jensen's metaphor and started his own speech with the same coin tossing experiment. There was one difference, he noted: somehow, a statistically significant share of the winning minority belongs to the same school. They follow value investing rules set up by Graham and Dodd, and consistently beat the averages by applying the same methods to different investment assets.

== The statement ==
Buffett starts the article with a rebuttal of a popular academic opinion that Graham and Dodd's approach ("look for values with a significant margin of safety relative to [stock] prices") had been made obsolete by improvements in market analysis and information technology. If the markets are efficient, then no one can beat the market in the long run; and apparent long-term success can happen by pure chance only. However, argues Buffett, if a substantial share of these long-term winners belong to a group of value investing adherents, and they operate independently of each other, then their success is more than a lottery win; it is a triumph of the right strategy.

Buffett then proceeds to present nine successful investment funds which applied their own version of Graham and Dodd's value investing principles over long periods with exceptional returns. One is his own Buffett Partnership, liquidated in 1969. Two are pension funds with three and eight portfolio managers; Buffett asserts he had influence in selecting value-minded managers and the overall strategy of these funds. The other six funds were managed by Buffett's business associates or people otherwise well-known to Buffett. The seven investment partnerships demonstrated average long-term returns with a double-digit lead over the market average, while the two pension funds, more restricted by regulations and bound to more conservative portfolio mixes, showed leads of 5% and 8%.

Fund	Manager	Investment approach and constraints	Fund Period	Fund Return	Market return
WJS Limited Partners	Walter J. Schloss	Diversified small portfolio (over 100 stocks, US$45M), second-tier stock	1956–1984	21.3% / 16.1%	8.4% (S&P)
TBK Limited Partners	Tom Knapp	Mix of passive investments and strategic control in small public companies	1968–1983	20.0% / 16.0%	7.0% (DJIA)
Buffett Partnership, Ltd.	Warren Buffett	Various under-valued assets, including American Express, Dempsters, Sun Newspapers, and prominently Berkshire Hathaway	1957–1969	29.5% / 23.8%	7.4% (DJIA)
Sequoia Fund, Inc.	William J. Ruane	Preference for blue chips stock	1970–1984	18.2%	10.0%
Charles Munger, Ltd.	Charles Munger	Concentration on a small number of undervalued stock	1962–1975	19.8% / 13.7%	5.0% (DJIA)
Pacific Partners, Ltd.	Rick Guerin		1965–1983	32.9% / 23.6%	7.8% (S&P)
Perlmeter Investments, Ltd	Stan Perlmeter		1965–1983	23.0% / 19.0%	7.0% (DJIA)
Washington Post Master Trust	3 different managers	Must keep 25% in fixed interest instruments	1978–1983	21.8%	7.0% (DJIA)
FMC Corporation Pension Fund	8 different managers		1975–1983	17.1%	12.6% (Becker Avg.)

Buffett takes special care to explain that the nine funds have little in common except the value strategy and personal connections to himself. Even when there are no striking differences in stock portfolio, individual mixes and timing of purchases are substantially different. The managers were indeed independent of each other.

Buffett made three side notes concerning value investment theory. First, he underscored Graham–Dodd's postulate: the higher the margin between price of undervalued stock and its value, the lower is investors' risk. On the opposite, as margin gets thinner, risks increase. Second, potential returns diminish with increasing size of the fund, as the number of available undervalued stocks decreases. Finally, analyzing the backgrounds of seven successful managers, he makes a conclusion that an individual either accepts value investing strategy at first sight, or never accepts it, regardless of training and other people's examples. "There seems to be a perverse human characteristic that likes to make easy things difficult... it's likely to continue this way. Ships will sail around the world, but the Flat Earth Society will flourish... and those who read their Graham and Dodd will continue to prosper".

== Influence ==
Graham-and-Doddsville influenced Seth Klarman's 1991 Margin of Safety and was cited by Klarman as a principal source; "Buffett's argument has never, to my knowledge, been addressed by the efficient-market theorists; they evidently prefer to continue to prove in theory what was refuted in practice". Klarman's book, never reprinted, has achieved a cult status, and sells for four-digit prices.

Buffett's article was a "titular subject" of 2001 Value Investing: From Graham to Buffett and Beyond.

In 2005 Louis Lowenstein compiled Graham-and-Doddsville Revisited – a review of the changes in mutual fund economics, comparing the Goldfarb Ten funds against Buffett's value investing standard. Lowenstein pointed out that "value investing requires not just patient managers but also patient investors", since value investing managers have also demonstrated regular drops in portfolio values (offset by subsequent profits).

== Reactions ==
Buffett, despite his untarnished reputation in mainstream business press, remains rarely cited within traditional academia in general terms and the Superinvestors article has been almost entirely ignored. A 2004 search of 23,000 papers on economics revealed only 20 references to any publication by Buffett.

A significant share of references simply rebut Buffett's statements or reduce his own success to pure luck and probability theory. William F. Sharpe (1995) called him "a three-sigma event" (1 in 370), Michael Lewis (1989) a "big winner produced by a random game". On the other hand, Aswath Damodaran, Professor of Finance at the Stern School of Business at NYU, referred to Buffett's findings as a proof markets are not always efficient.

An analysis published in 2010 found most of the superinvestors described by Buffett continued their superior performance after 1984. Due to a lack of data, Perlmeter and Guerin were assumed not to have met the criteria and were excluded. They also had no direct contact with Graham.

Joe Carlen, in his 2012 biography of Graham, notes that most individual investors discussed in the Superinvestors article have continued to consistently apply their interpretations of Graham's principles, and most also continued to perform well. These investors often regularly beat the market averages in subsequent years, but usually not to the extreme levels they did from the 1960s to '80s. "[T]he fact that five of the seven superinvestors continued to excel after 1984 proves that [Buffett's] central argument remains valid."
