= Max Heine =

American investor (1911–1988)

Max L. Heine (1911 – February 12, 1988) was a value investor and fund manager in New York City. He specialized in buying assets from highly distressed situations like bankruptcies, defaults, reorganizations and liquidations when many investors had dismissed the assets as worthless but which Heine recognized had financial desirability.

== Biography ==
A Jewish law student in Berlin, Max fled Nazi Germany in 1934 for New York City, where he found work in a department store. Sometime in the late 1930s or early 1940s, Max came across the classic book on value investing, Security Analysis by Benjamin Graham, the well-known mentor of other value investors, including Warren Buffett.

He decided to invest all of the money he and his new bride had in distressed railroad securities. By analyzing the value of the underlying assets (land, railroad equipment, scrap metals, etc.) and basing his calculations of total value on them, he made a large return on his modest investment. This deep value analysis became his signature approach to investing and he founded Heine Securities as an investment management company.

In 1949, Heine founded the Mutual Shares fund, an open-ended mutual fund managed by his company, Heine Securities, and which is still available today as part of the Franklin Templeton family of funds. The focus of this and other Mutual Series funds has continued to emphasize deep-value and distressed company investing as of 2004.

Under Max's leadership, the Mutual Series of funds maintained a relatively small set of exclusive investors, only managing about $5 million in 1975. They specialized in older, higher net worth clients who did not usually have financial advisors, and kept expenses low by not paying commissions or 12b-1 "trails".

The Stern School of Business at New York University has an endowed professorship named after the investor: the Max L. Heine Professor of Finance. As of March 2007, this position is held by Edward I. Altman who has held it since 1988.

Heine died on February 12, 1988 when he was hit by a car while vacationing in Tucson, Arizona. His obituary ran in the New York Times. He left behind three daughters (Doris, Karin and Peggy) and four grandchildren. The reins of the Mutual Series then passed to his protogé Michael Price, who had already been a full partner in managing the company since 1982.
