= Bruce Greenwald =

American economist

- Born: August 15, 1946 (age 80)

Academic background
- Education: Massachusetts Institute of Technology (BS, PhD); Princeton University (MS, MPA)

Academic work
- Discipline: Economics, investing
- Institutions: Columbia University

Bruce Corman Norbert Greenwald (born August 15, 1946) is an American economist and professor at Columbia University's Graduate School of Business and an advisor at First Eagle Investment Management. He is, among others, the author of the books Value Investing: from Graham to Buffett and Beyond and Competition Demystified: A Radically Simplified Approach to Business Strategy. He has been referred to by The New York Times as "a guru to Wall Street's gurus" and is a recognized authority on value investing, along with additional expertise in productivity and the economics of information.

== Biography ==
Greenwald received a B.S. in electrical engineering from MIT in 1967, a M.S. in electrical engineering and M.P.A. from Princeton University in 1969, and a Ph.D. from MIT in economics in 1978. Before arriving at Columbia in 1991, Greenwald was a research economist at Bell Laboratories and later Bell Communications Research, and an assistant professor at Harvard Business School.

== Books ==
- Competition Demystified: A Radically Simplified Approach to Business Strategy (2005)
- Value Investing: From Graham to Buffett and Beyond (2001)
- Value Investing: From Graham to Buffett and Beyond 2nd Edition (2020)

== See also ==
- Value investing
- Benjamin Graham
- David Dodd
- Warren Buffett
- Greenwald-Stiglitz theorem
