= Christopher H. Browne =

American value investor

Christopher H. Browne (1946 – December 13, 2009) was a famous American value investor, and longtime director at the firm Tweedy, Browne. Browne was called "one of the best value investors in the world" by Morgan Stanley funds manager Barton Biggs.

== Biography ==
=== Early life ===
He graduated from the University of Pennsylvania in 1969 with a B.A. in history.

=== Career ===
He started his career at the firm Tweedy, Browne, co-founded by his father Howard Browne and a favorite brokerage firm among prominent value investors like Benjamin Graham and Warren Buffett. His success as an investor and shareholder, who held business management accountable, was renowned. For example, both Tweedy, Browne's Value and Global Value Funds outperformed market averages between 1993 and 2009. In 2003, Browne was the first to publicly speak up about irregularities in Conrad Black's management of Hollinger, reporting Black to the Securities and Exchange Commission. Black was forced out later that year and ultimately convicted of fraud.

In 2006 Browne authored a book, The Little Book of Value Investing, in order to teach ordinary investors the principles used throughout his career.

=== Philanthropy ===
Browne donated $25 million to establish several endowed professorships at the University of Pennsylvania, where he was a trustee. His donation funded professorships held by Amy Gutmann and Rogers Smith.

== Death ==
Upon his 2009 death, Christopher Browne was survived by his partner, architect Andrew S. Gordon, who died on September 7, 2013.

Browne bequeathed the bulk of his $250 million estate to Gordon, a much younger man and a relatively new acquaintance. Several of Browne's family and friends accused Gordon of exercising undue influence to obtain Browne's estate, and filed a will contest. In 2013, after a judge upheld the validity of Browne's will, Gordon settled the contest for an undisclosed payment to those who had challenged the will.
