= Security analysis =

Evaluation of financial investment value

In finance, security analysis is the evaluation and assessment of stocks or securities to determine their investment potential. It involves analyzing various factors, such as financial statements, industry trends, market conditions, and company-specific information, to make informed investment decisions. There are two primary approaches to security analysis, fundamental analysis and technical analysis.

Security analysis deals with finding the proper value of individual securities (i.e., stocks, bonds and derivatives). These are usually classified into debt securities, equities, or some hybrid of the two. They can also include derivatives such as tradeable credit derivatives, commodities, futures contracts and options even if some of these are not technically securities.

The definition of what is and what is not a security varies by analyst but a common definition is the one used by the United States Supreme Court decision in the case of SEC v. W. J. Howey Co. Security analysis for the purpose to state the effective value of an enterprise is typically based on the examination of fundamental business factors such as financial statements, going concern, business strategy and forecasts.

== See also ==
- Financial analyst
- Business valuation
- Securities research
- Security Analysis (book)
- Quantitative analysis (finance)
- Value investing
