= Mr. Market =

Allegory created by Benjamin Graham

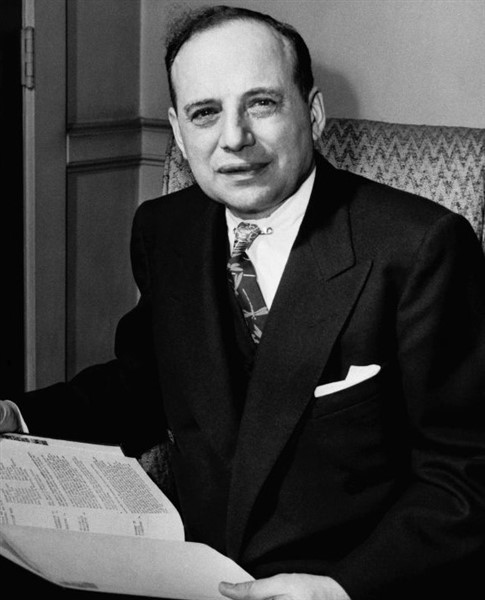
Mr. Market is an allegory created by investor Benjamin Graham.

Mr. Market is an allegory created by investor Benjamin Graham to describe what he believed were the irrational or contradictory traits of the stock market and the risks of following groupthink. Mr. Market was first introduced in his 1949 book, The Intelligent Investor.

== Allegory ==
=== Character ===
Mr. Market is described by Benjamin Graham as a fickle investor primarily ruled by his emotions from day-to-day.

Graham asks the reader to imagine that they are one of the two owners of a business, along with a partner called Mr. Market. The partner frequently offers to sell their share of the business or to buy the reader's share. This partner is what today would be called manic-depressive, with their estimate of the business's value going from very pessimistic to wildly optimistic. The reader is always free to decline the partner's offer, since they will soon come back with an entirely different offer.

=== Traits ===
Mr. Market is often identified as having human behavioral manic-depressive characteristics, he:

1. Is emotional, euphoric, moody
2. Is often irrational
3. Offers that transactions are strictly at your option
4. Is there to serve you, not to guide you.
5. Is in the short run a voting machine, in the long run a weighing machine.
6. Will offer you a chance to buy low, and sell high.
7. Is frequently efficient…but not always.

This behavior of Mr. Market allows the investor to wait until Mr. Market is in a 'pessimistic mood' and offers low sale price. The investor has the option to buy at that low price. Therefore, patience is an important virtue when dealing with Mr. Market.

== Influence ==
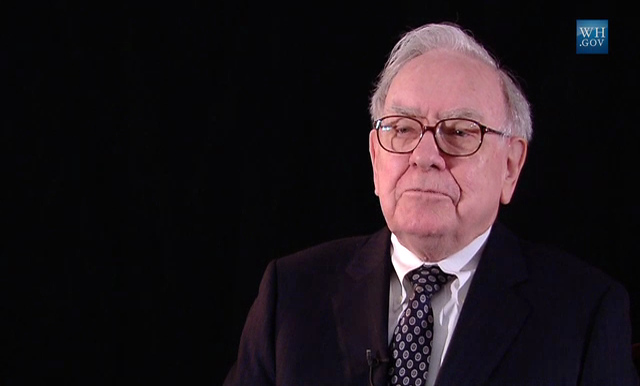
Warren Buffett has frequently advocated investors heed the lessons of Mr. Market.

Since its introduction in Graham's 1949 book The Intelligent Investor, it has been cited many times to explain that the stock market tends to fluctuate. The example makes it clear that the sole reason for the change in price is Mr. Market's emotions. A rational person will sell if the price is high and buy if the price is low. He would not sell because the price has gone down or buy because the price has gone up. Graham instead believes that it is important to focus on whether the stock valuation of a company is reasonable after calculating its value through fundamental analysis. Warren Buffett has frequently quoted Graham's 1949 book, The Intelligent Investor. Chapter eight covers Mr. Market and Warren Buffett thinks that this is the best part of the book. Buffett described it as "by far the best book on investing ever written".

Elaine Wyatt wrote in her 1994 book Financial Times - The Money Companion, "Before you begin your trek into the nitty-gritty of investing, you should meet Mr. Market. Mr. Market is the creation of Benjamin Graham, who in 1949 wrote a book called The Intelligent Investor. Graham's influence has reached every corner of the financial world". Janet Lowe observed in her 1997 book, Value Investing Made Easy, "James Grant is such a devotee of Graham that he named his book Minding Mr. Market after a parable Graham often used". In his 1999 work, The Warren Buffett Portfolio, author Robert G. Hagstrom commented, "The well-known story of Mr. Market is a brilliant lesson on how and why stock prices periodically depart from rationality." Hagstrom observed that the Mr. Market parable, "is a lesson learned well by Buffett, that he in turn urges all others to embrace." Hagstrom pointed out, "It is easy to see why Warren Buffett has, on several occasions, shared the story of Mr. Market with Berkshire Hathaway shareholders."

Writing in his 2001 book, J.K. Lasser's Pick Stocks Like Warren Buffett, author Warren Boroson called Benjamin Graham's Mr. Market concept, "a famous metaphor he invented". Mark Hirschey commented in 2003 in his work Tech Stock Valuation, "In his classic book, The Intelligent Investor, Benjamin Graham ... describes the relationship between the intelligent long-term investor and market fluctuation using his now famous Mr. Market metaphor."

In his 2015 book Heroes and Villains of Finance, author Adam Baldwin wrote that, "Famously, Graham used the analogy of 'Mr. Market' in order to portray his value investing strategy". In his 2016 work on shareholder activism, Dear Chairman, author Jeff Gramm observed, "The Intelligent Investor is most famous for the parable of Mr. Market and the concept of 'margin of safety'."

== See also ==
- Behavioral economics
- Emotional bias
- Hindsight bias
- Margin of safety (financial)
- Value investing
