= Jerome Newman =

American financier and business executive

Jerome A. Newman
- Born: 1897; United States
- Died: 1980 (aged 82–83); New York City
- Occupations: Investor, financier, corporate executive
- Known for: Co-founder of Graman-Newman Corp. with Benjamin Graham

Jerome A. Newman (1897–1980) was an American financier, corporate executive, and philanthropist, known for partnering with Benjamin Graham in the Graman-Newman Corp. investment fund.

A 1917 graduate of Columbia University and its law school (1919), Newman began his notable business career in 1926 by co-founding the Graham-Newman Corporation alongside Benjamin Graham. He served as the investment firm's president until its dissolution in 1956. His executive career included roles as president of the Atlantic Gulf and West Indies Steamship Lines (1950–1952), chairman of the board for Government Employees Insurance Company (1951–1964), and chairman of the finance committee for Warner Brothers-Seven Arts.

In his later years, Newman focused on philanthropy, particularly supporting Jewish charities and his alma mater. He served as chairman of the board of visitors for Columbia College and co-chaired the university's "Quality of Life Campaign." For his service, Columbia awarded him the Alexander Hamilton Medal and a Presidential Citation. Additionally, he was a prominent supporter of the Jewish Guild for the Blind, where the New York headquarters was named in honor of his first wife, Estelle. Newman also held board positions with Bennington College, the New York Shakespeare Theater, and the American Jewish Committee.
