= Value premium =

In investing, value premium refers to the greater risk-adjusted return of value stocks over growth stocks. Eugene Fama and Kenneth French first identified the premium in 1992, using a measure they called HML (high book-to-market ratio minus low book-to-market ratio) to measure equity returns. Other experts, such as John C. Bogle, have argued that no value premium exists, claiming that Fama and French's research is period dependent.
