= Benjamin Graham formula =

Formula for the valuation of growth stocks

The Benjamin Graham formula is a formula for the valuation of growth stocks.

It was proposed by investor and professor of Columbia University, Benjamin Graham - often referred to as the "father of value investing". Published in his book, The Intelligent Investor, Graham devised the formula for lay investors to help them with valuing growth stocks, in vogue at the time of the formula's publication.

Graham cautioned here that the formula was not appropriate for companies with a "below-par" debt position: "My advice to analysts would be to limit your appraisals to enterprises of investment quality, excluding from that category such as do not meet specific criteria of financial strength".

== Formula calculation ==
In Graham's words: "Our study of the various methods has led us to suggest a foreshortened and quite simple formula for the evaluation of growth stocks, which is intended to produce figures fairly close to those resulting from the more refined mathematical calculations."

The formula as described by Graham originally in the 1962 edition of Security Analysis, and then again in the 1973 edition of The Intelligent Investor, is as follows:

$$V^* = \mathrm{EPS} \times (8.5 + 2g)$$

$V^*$ = the value expected from the growth formulas over the next 7 to 10 years
$EPS$ = trailing twelve months earnings per share
$8.5$ = P/E base for a no-growth company
$g$ = reasonably expected 7 to 10 year growth rate (see Sustainable growth rate § From a financial perspective)

=== Revised formula ===
Graham later revised his formula based on the belief that the greatest contributing factor to stock values (and prices) over the past decade had been interest rates. In 1974, he restated it as follows:

The Graham formula proposes to calculate a company's intrinsic value $V^*$ as:

$$V^* = \cfrac{\mathrm{EPS} \times (8.5 + 2g) \times 4.4}{Y}$$

$V^*$ = the value expected from the growth formulas over the next 7 to 10 years
$EPS$ = the company's last 12-month earnings per share
$8.5$ = P/E base for a no-growth company
$g$ = reasonably expected 7 to 10 Year Growth Rate of EPS
$4.4$ = the average yield of AAA corporate bonds in 1962 (Graham did not specify the duration of the bonds, though it has been asserted that he used 20 year AAA bonds as his benchmark for this variable)
$Y$ = the current yield on AAA corporate bonds.

== Application ==
In The Intelligent Investor, Graham was careful to include a footnote that this formula was not being recommended for use by investors — rather, it was to model the expected results of other growth formulas popular at the time.

However, a misconception arose that he was using this formula in his daily work due to a later reprinted edition's decision to move footnotes to the back of the book, where fewer readers searched for them. Readers who continued on in the chapter would have found Graham stating:

Warning: This material is supplied for illustrative purposes only, and because of the inescapable necessity of security analysis to project the future growth rate for most companies studied. Let the reader not be mislead into thinking that such projections have any high degree of reliability, or, conversely, that future prices can be counted on to behave accordingly as the prophecies are realized, surpassed, or disappointed.

The movement of the footnote in the reprint has led to an assortment of advisers and investors recommending this formula (or revised versions of it) to the public at large — a practice that continues to this day. Benjamin Clark, the founder of the blog and investment service ModernGraham, acknowledges the footnote and argues that "I consider the footnote to be more of a reminder from Graham that the calculation of an intrinsic value is not an exact science and cannot be done with 100% certainty." Clark further explains that the formula "is to be used for estimating intrinsic value within a margin of safety which will accommodate the possibility of error in calculation."

Graham also cautioned that his calculations were not perfect, even in the time period for which it was published, noting in the 1973 edition of The Intelligent Investor: "We should have added caution somewhat as follows: The valuations of expected high-growth stocks are necessarily on the low side, if we were to assume these growth rates will actually be realized." He continued on to point out that if a stock were to be assumed to grow forever, its value would be infinite.

== See also ==
- Altman Z-score
- Beneish M-score
- Ohlson O-score
- Fundamental analysis
- Magic formula investing
- Value investing
- TMAI
- FPI - Fundamental Power Index
