= Price College of Business =

Business school of the University of Oklahoma

Coordinates: 35.207969°N 97.444265°W

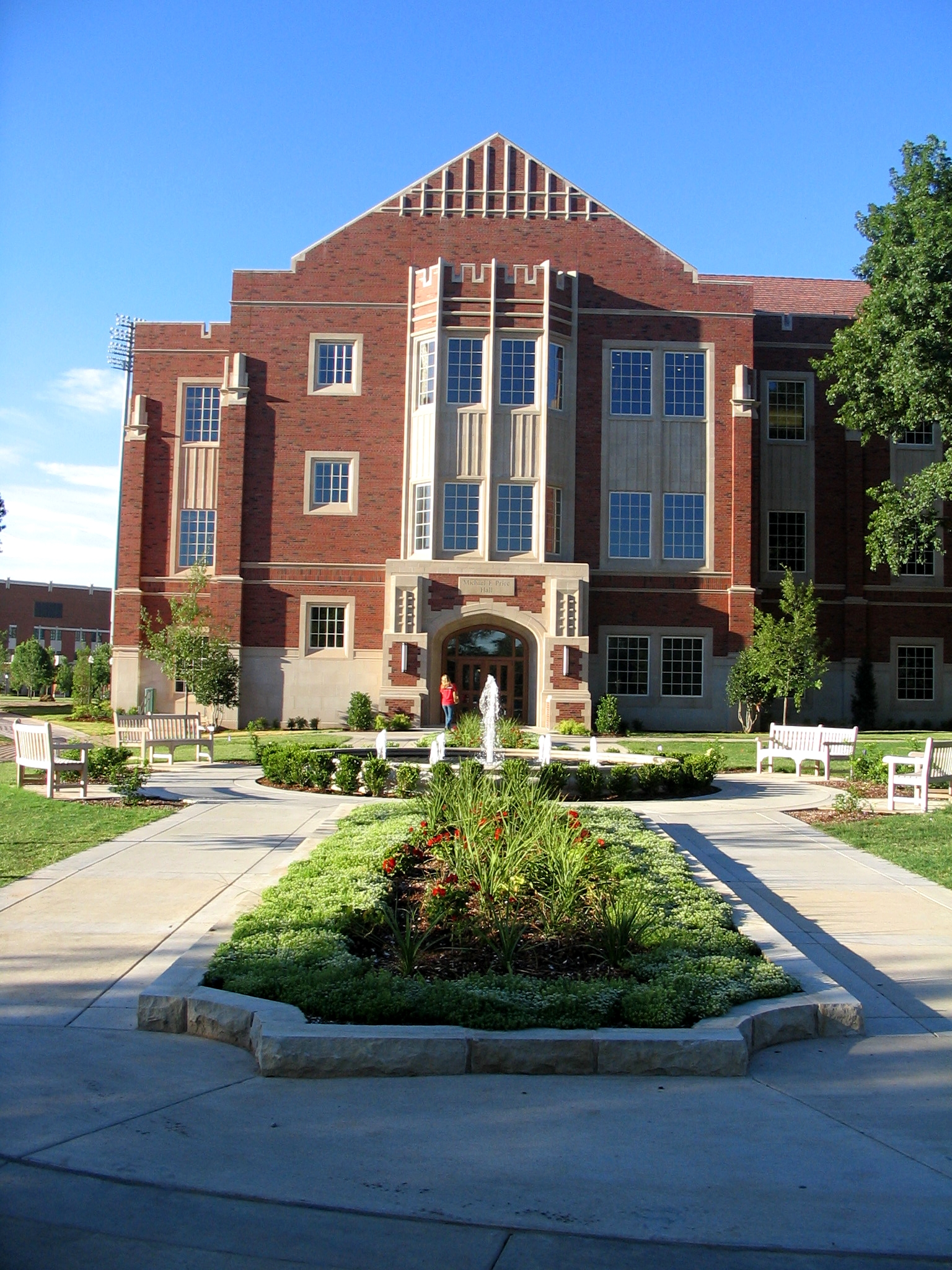
The north entrance to the new Price Hall

The Michael F. Price College of Business is the business school of the University of Oklahoma, a public university in Norman, Oklahoma, United States. It was established in 1917 and currently has 5,500 students. The OU Price College of Business undergraduate program currently ranks No. 64 nationally and the top-ranked business school in Oklahoma by U.S. News And World Report.

== History ==
The College of Business was founded in 1917 (under the name the School of Public and Private Business), making it one of the first business schools west of the Mississippi River. It had started as the School of Commerce and Industry in 1913 under the School of Arts & Sciences, before emerging as its present form four years later. Before World War II, the college of business administration experienced a period of tremendous growth. Between 1923 and 1929, the enrollment in the college increased over 700%. In September 1936, as a result of a legislative appropriation, a new building housing the College of Business was opened. This was named Adams Hall after Arthur Barto Adams, the dean at the time.

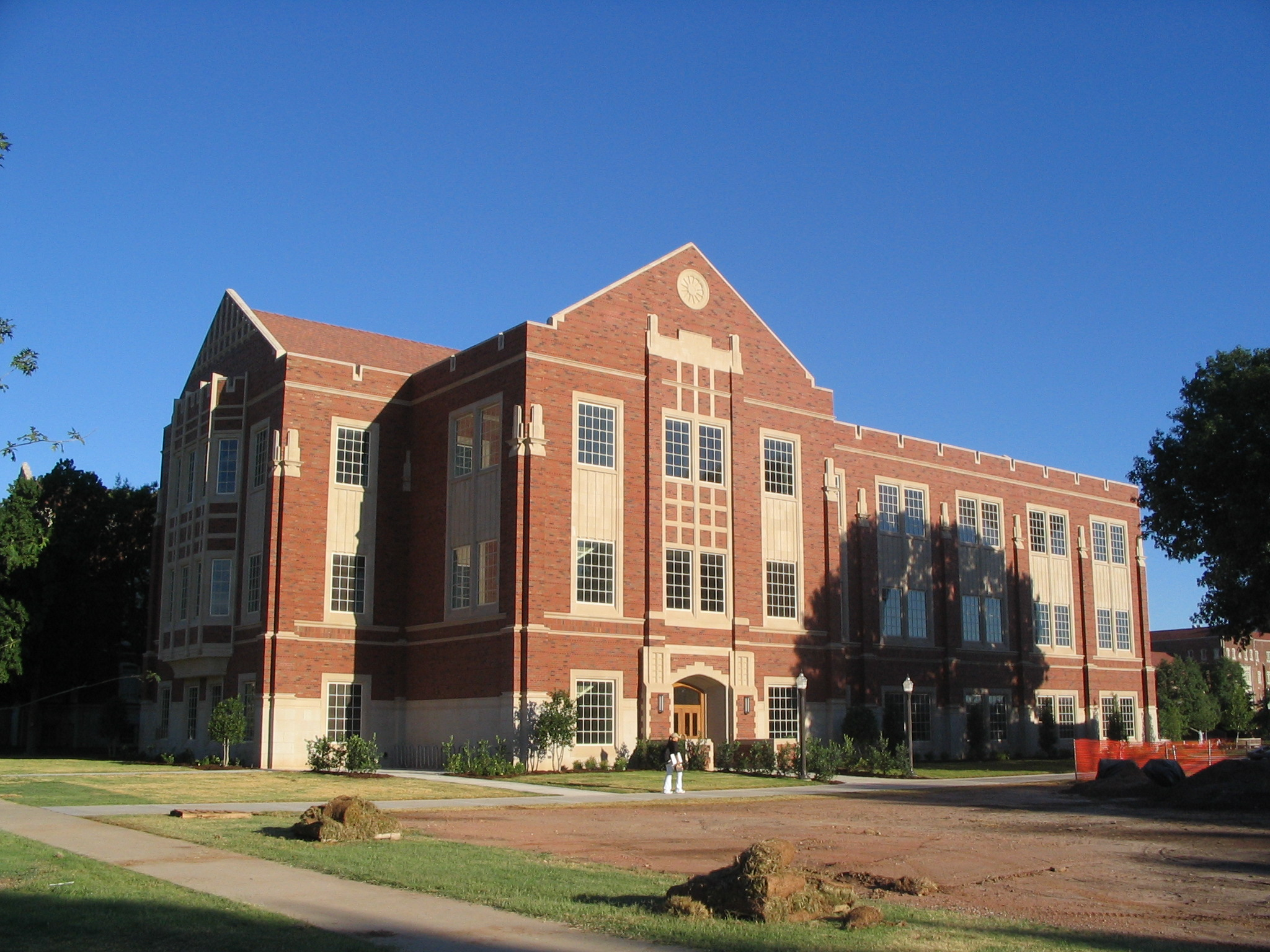
The southeast corner of the new Price Hall

When it first opened, it also housed other classes, including geography, sociology, and social service. The building was designed by Joe E. Smay, the director for the school of architectural engineering.

In 1997, investor Michael F. Price donated 18 million USD to the university. Subsequently, the College of Business was renamed after him, the first OU college named for an individual. In 2002, Price donated an additional 7.2 million USD, which was a large portion of the 19 million USD needed to erect an addition to the existing Adams Hall. The new building, which completed in late 2004, was named Price Hall. Laku Chidambaram is the Dean of the Michael F. Price College of Business at the University of Oklahoma.

== Academics ==
Business school rankings

U.S. MBA Rankings
- Bloomberg (2025): 70

There are eight divisions in the College of Business along with 11 majors and an undecided option. The most popular majors are accounting (14%), marketing and supply chain management (13%), and finance (13%). Other popular majors include management information systems, international business, entrepreneurship and venture management, general management, and energy management.

The U.S. News & World Report ranks the MBA program at the Price College of Business 66th in the country. The College of Business is ranked 47th in the country. It also ranks the International Business program 13th and the Management Information Systems program 16th.

In 1999, the Energy Management program changed its name from Petroleum Land Management. When this major was created, it was the first of its kind in the world.

== Student organizations ==
Price College offers many student organizations for its various majors, including:

- Beta Alpha Psi, honorary accounting fraternity
- ConnXions
- Delta Sigma Pi
- Economics Club
- Energy Management Student Association
- ENT Club
- Finance Student Association
- International Business Association
- JCPenney Leadership Program
- MIS Student Association
- Society for Human Resource Management
- Student Business Association
