= Helen Reichert =

American talk show personality

- Born: Helen Faith Kahn; November 11, 1901; Manhattan, New York, U.S.
- Died: September 25, 2011 (aged 109); Manhattan, New York, U.S.
- Education: Cornell University (BA); Columbia University (MA)
- Occupations: American talk show personality and educator

Helen "Happy" Reichert (November 11, 1901 – September 25, 2011) was an American talk show personality, New York University professor, founder of The Round Table of Fashion Executives, and the oldest living alumnus of Cornell University at the time of her death at age 109, just seven weeks before she would have become a supercentenarian.

== Early life ==
Helen Faith Kahn was born on November 11, 1901, on the Lower East Side of Manhattan to Polish Jewish immigrants. As a young girl, she participated in the Girl Scouts of the United States of America (GSUSA) and had the distinction of being a member of the first Girl Scout Troop to sell World War I war bonds.

In 1925, Reichert graduated Phi Beta Kappa with a degree in English from the College of Arts and Sciences at Cornell University. She experienced anti-Semitism in Ithaca as a Cornell student and had to change her name from Kahn to Keane due to Collegetown realtors refusing to rent an apartment to a Jewish woman. During her undergraduate career, she lived in Risley Hall on East Hill. According to her caretaker Olive Villaluna, Reichert worked in the cafeteria because "she was ashamed of asking her parents for money to buy cigarettes." She also participated in the women's crew team and is, according to IvyLeagueSports.com, "arguably the program's most well-known alumna."

In 1931, Reichert earned a master's degree in psychology from Teachers College, Columbia University.

== Career in fashion ==
In 1947, Reichert began her thirty-year-long teaching career at The Graduate School of Retailing at New York University, where she taught "Fashion Co-ordination" and a self-created course called "Costume History." She has been credited with co-founding the Round Table of Fashion Executives in 1949. As a result of the growing Fashion Group International, it became increasingly difficult to network with other women in the industry. In addition, for six years, she worked as a copywriter for Bloomingdale's, ultimately rising to the position of Fashion Coordinator. She later transferred to Montgomery Ward, a mail-order catalog and retail company, and worked as a fashion coordinator.

== Broadcasting career ==
In 1951, she hosted the award-winning TV talk show, FYI: The Helen Faith Keane Show, airing on New York City's Channel 5. The show resulted from Reichert's dissatisfaction with a male commentator from a fashion show broadcast over the DuMont network who she believed was "uninformed and condescending on the topic." She telephoned the company and was told that if she felt she could do a better job, she should come down to the station and try it herself. She agreed. Over lunch, the producer, Keith Thomas, offered her a show.

The viewing audience sent in questions or problems to the show. Reichert along with the production staff would construct a show around popular topics sent in by viewers; each episode featured experts in the relevant field. Examples of topics covered by the daily program were cooking, housekeeping advice, how to play piano, narcotics, and talking to one's doctor about breast cancer. Because the show was designed to benefit the community, it performed a great deal of public outreach, including promoting the League of Women Voters and garnering donations for the Volunteers of America.

In 1951, her show was awarded the McCall's Golden Mike Award for Women in Radio and Television. According to the description on the cover of the program of the award ceremony, "The McCall's Awards to Women in Radio and Television [...] are the only awards given exclusively to women Broadcasters and Executives for public service accomplishments in the communications field. Judged solely on evidence submitted by the contestants, [the award ...] set a publishing precedent. McCall's is the only magazine with a national circulation which has ever paid tribute to the public service record of any group in radio and television."

One of the judges, Senator Margaret Chase Smith of Maine, stated "The material was inspiring evidence of what women can do, and are doing, for our country and our people."

== Personal and family life ==
In 1939, fourteen years after graduating from Cornell University, Reichert married cardiologist Dr. Philip Reichert, M.D. (Weill Cornell Medical College '23). Her husband was a founding member, trustee, and governor of The American College of Cardiology (founded in 1949), and served as its executive director from 1952 to 1962. Much of his rare diagnostic medical equipment and personal archives (correspondence, publications, notebooks, biographical information, minutes and transactions of the Board of Trustees of the American College of Cardiology, research, and other miscellaneous literature) were donated by his wife to Weill Cornell and are on permanent display in the college's faculty room. Dr. Reichert died on March 19, 1985, at the age of 87. The couple had no children.

Helen Reichert founded the Helen F. Reichert Scholarship, awarded to medical students of Weill Cornell, in honor of her husband, who resolved to become a doctor after watching a doctor tend to his dying father. In order to put himself through school, her husband needed to work multiple jobs but ended with a lifelong, happy career. She stated that her hope was to "help someone else reach that dream."

Helen Reichert had three siblings: sister Leonore (Lee) Reichart and brothers Irving Kahn, the noted value investor, and Peter Keane, a Hollywood cinematographer and film executive, who also changed his last name from Kahn to Keane to avoid anti-Semitism. The four siblings were all centenarians.

Later in life, Reichert confessed that there is no reason why she should have lived as long as she did. She hated vegetables, getting up early, and most things associated with living a healthy lifestyle. She loved rare hamburgers, chocolate, cocktails, and nightlife in New York, including exotic restaurants, Broadway shows, movies, and the Metropolitan Opera. She smoked for over eighty years.

== Death ==
Helen Reichert died of natural causes on September 25, 2011, in her Park Avenue apartment in New York City at the age of 109. Olive Villaluna, her caretaker for more than 11 years, said that Reichert died "as she had wanted to, comfortably in her chair with a smile." She was survived by her two centenarian brothers, Irving and Peter, aged 105 and 101, respectively, at the time of her death, as well as many nieces and nephews.

In her will, she bequeathed her body to research at Weill Cornell Medical College. In addition, she bequeathed a $100,000 gift to the Residential Initiative in support of Cornell's West Campus House System. The Reichert Suite in Carl Becker House is named in her honor. In lieu of flowers, she requested that donations be made to Cornell Medical College. Her will was changed by her attorney when she was just shy of her 109th birthday. The new version excluded family who had been her closest confidantes.

== As a subject of genetic research ==
Because Helen Reichert and her siblings were all centenarians (her younger sister, Leonore Kahn Reichart, who was born May 25, 1903, died on February 18, 2005, at the age of 101, researchers have been studying them to see if longevity is correlated to genetics. Geneticist Nir Barzilai, a researcher who studied the biology of aging for over a decade, included the Kahn siblings and other Ashkenazi Jews in his research. He asked the pool about the details of their living habits: nutrition, alcohol consumption, smoking, physical activity, sleep, education, status, and spirituality. Barzilai and the team of researchers at Einstein's Institute for Aging Research discovered three genes common to the centenarians that may be the key to their long life. The first is a gene that increases the amount of HDL (HDL cholesterol) to two to three times higher than average, which Barzilai believes is part of the reason for the siblings' mental acuity at an old age. The second is a gene that slows metabolism as a result of a mildly underactive thyroid gland. The last is a mutation in axis, a human growth hormone that could possibly protect against age-related diseases, such as cancer.
