= Greenwald-Stiglitz theorem =

The Greenwald-Stiglitz theorem shows that an economy with externalities or distortions associated with imperfect information and incomplete markets is in general not constrained Pareto optimal, and there exist government interventions such as taxes and subsidies to make a Pareto improvement. The constrained Pareto inefficiency of the economy was established by Bruce Greenwald and Joseph Stiglitz, and it shed light on the First Fundamental Theorem of Welfare Economics. It helps consider the welfare consequences of policy interventions, treating distortions arising from imperfections as technological externalities. It also presents that pecuniary externalities have significant effects in economies with distortions, and they have significant welfare consequences. Furthermore, it raises the possibilities of boosting Pareto efficiency by quotas even if a tax-subsidy system does not work.

== Introduction ==
In a situation where individual actions have unintended consequences on others, the market fails to make the optimal allocation of resources. And the constrained Pareto inefficiency is common in markets as externality-like effects and distortions arise from information imperfection and incomplete markets. This creates a case for government intervention to correct market inefficiencies and ensure overall wellbeing.

In moral hazard models, for example, the individual opts for a certain level of care and takes the premium as given, based on their own self-interest, knowing that insurance providers cannot accurately track their behaviour. Meanwhile, the cost of their insurance is influenced by the average level of accident avoidance of those who are insured -- that is, an individual purchaser suffers from an externality-like effect. Therefore, if all individuals choose to take greater precautions, the overall cost of insurance decreases, leading to a positive outcome for all individuals involved. Then, the government can encourage him to increase the level of care because subsidizing complements to care and taxing substitutes can affect consumption patterns. Specifically, by imposing a tax on activities that increase the risk of accidents, such as smoking, which enhances the likelihood of fires, the government can effectively lower accident rates by decreasing the prevalence of high-risk behaviors.

The distortion arising from the change in consumption patterns due to the government intervention leads to a second-order loss, but it is outweighed by a first-order effect resulting from the reduced premiums.

=== Sketch ===
Let $X$ and $q = (q_{1}, q_{2}, \ldots, q_{M} )$ be the vector of goods and the associated vector of consumer prices, respectively. And $p^{H}$ is the accident probability for the case where the level of care is high, and $p^{L}$ low care. Also, the parameters regarding contract $\lbrace \alpha, \beta \rbrace$ are given, consisting of the net benefit $\alpha$ in the event of accident and the premium $\beta$. For high care, the vector of goods is $X^{H} = p^{H} X^{H1} + (1-p^{H}) X^{H0}$, where $X^{H1}$ is the consumption vector in the event of an accident and $X^{H0}$ no accident. Now the expected utility $V^{H}$ for high care is maximized, under the social revenue constraint $\alpha p^{H}=\beta (1-p^{H}) + (q-1)X^{H}$ and the self-selection constraint that the expected utility for low care is less than or equal to that for high care.

As to the Lagrangian for the model,

$$L= V^{H} + \gamma ( \alpha p^{H} - \beta (1- p^{H}) - (q-1) X^{H} ) + \lambda (V^{H} - V^{L} )$$

and its partial derivatives are evaluated at q=1; this corresponds to a case where there is no differential taxation

$$\frac{\partial L}{\partial q_{k}} \Big|_{q=1} = \frac{\partial V^{H}}{\partial q_{k}} - \gamma \frac{\partial X^{H} }{\partial q_{k} } +
\lambda ( \frac{\partial V^{H}}{\partial q_{k}}
- \frac{\partial V^{L}}{\partial q_{k}}
)$$
$$\frac{\partial L}{\partial \alpha} \Big|_{q=1} = \frac{\partial V^{H}}{\partial \alpha}
+ \gamma p^{H} +
\lambda ( \frac{\partial V^{H}}{\partial \alpha }
- \frac{\partial V^{L}}{\partial \alpha }
)
=0$$
$$\frac{\partial L}{\partial \beta} \Big|_{q=1} = \frac{\partial V^{H}}{\partial \beta }
- \gamma (1-p^{H}) +
\lambda ( \frac{\partial V^{H}}{\partial \beta }
- \frac{\partial V^{L}}{\partial \beta }
)
=0$$

When it comes to the marginal utility of income $\mu^{i1}, \quad ( \mu^{i0} )$ with care level i in the event of an accident (no accident), Roy's identity says $\frac{\partial V^{i} }{\partial q_{k} } = -p^{i} \mu^{i1} \frac{\partial X^{i1}}{\partial q_{k} } - (1- p^{i}) \mu^{i0} \frac{\partial X^{i0}}{\partial q_{k} }$. Also, $\frac{\partial V^{i}}{\partial \alpha}=p^{i} \mu^{i1}$ and $\frac{\partial V^{i}}{\partial \beta }=-(1-p^{i}) \mu^{i0}$.

Accordingly, adding $\frac{\partial L}{\partial \alpha } \Big|_{q=1} \frac{\partial X^{H1} }{\partial q_{k} } + \frac{\partial L}{\partial \beta } \Big|_{q=1} (- \frac{\partial X^{H0} }{\partial q_{k} } )$ to $\frac{\partial L}{\partial q_{k} } \Big|_{q=1}$ allows several terms to offset, resulting in

$$\frac{\partial L}{\partial q_{k} } \Big|_{q=1}=
\lambda
( p^{L} \mu^{L1} (X_{k}^{L1} - X_{k}^{H1}) +
(1- p^{L}) \mu^{L0} ( X_{k}^{L0} - X_{k}^{H0} )
)$$

Then, by putting $\bar{\mu}^{L}= p^{L} \mu^{L1} + (1-p^{L}) \mu^{L0}$, the equation becomes

$\frac{\partial L}{\partial q_{k}} \Big|_{q=1} = \lambda \bar{\mu}^{L} \left( \bar{X}_{k}^{L} - \bar{X}_{k}^{H} \right)$, where

$\bar{X}_{k}^{i} = \frac{1}{\bar{\mu}^{L} } ( p^{L} \mu^{L1} X_{k}^{i1} + (1-p^{L} ) \mu^{L0} X_{k}^{i0} )$. This equation means that the partial derivative in the left hand side of the equation is negative if $\bar{X}_{k} > \bar{X}_{k}^{L}$ and positive if $\bar{X}_{k} < \bar{X}_{k}^{L}$. It is therefore apparent that differential commodity taxation or subsidy is welfare-improving, and this result is interpreted in the following way. The individual's level of consumption of a commodity is correlated to his experience with taxation of that commodity. Therefore, in cases where he reduces his consumption of the commodity when switching from the risky activity to the safe, the impact of taxing that commodity will be mitigated if he is choosing the safe option. This change has a decisive effect on his behaviour, making him strictly prefer the safe activity to the risky. In cases where his level of consumption of the commodity is increased when switching from the risky to the safe, a subsidy on that commodity will have a greater beneficial effect if he is doing the safe activity and lead him to strictly prefer the safe option over the risky.

== Methodology ==
=== Problem settings ===
The model is constructed with three main parts: households, firms, and the government. Let $x^{h} =(x_{1}^{h}, \bar{x}^{h} )$ be an N-dimensional consumption vector of household h; $x_{1}^{h}$ is consumption for the numeraire good and $\bar{x}^{h}$ is for the N-1 nonnumeraire goods. Likewise $y^{f}=(y_{1}^{f}, \bar{y}^{f})$ is an N-dimensional production function of firm f.

Household utilities $u^{h}$ are maximized, placing financial constraints on spending $E^{h}$

$$x_{1}^{h} + q \cdot \bar{x}^{h} \leq I^{h} + \sum_{F} a^{hf} \cdots \pi^{f}$$

where $q$ is an (N-1)-dimensional vector representing the prices of N-1 nonnumeraire goods, and $\pi^{f}$ is the profits of firm f. Also, $I^{h}$ is a lump sum transfer from the government to household h. Then, the compensated demand for good $k$ keeping $z^{h}, u^{h}$ unchanged is $\hat{x}_{k}^{h} \equiv \frac{\partial E^{h} }{\partial q} \Big|_{z^{h}, u^{h}}$.

Under the condition that production of the numeraire good $y_{1}^{f}$ is equal to or less than production function $G^{f}$, profit maximization for firms is done:

$$\pi^{f}=y_{1}^{f}+ p \cdot \bar{y}^{f}$$

where $p$ is an (N-1)-dimensional vector representing produces' prices for the N-1 nonnumeraire goods. This implies that $\frac{\partial \pi_{*}^{f}}{\partial p_{k}} \Big|_{z^{f}} = y_{k}^{f}, \quad (k=1,2, \ldots, N)$ for the firm's maximum profit function $\pi_{*}^{f}$.

For the government, its net income is the difference between revenue and expenditure:

$$R \equiv t \cdot \bar{x} - \sum_{H} I^{h}$$

where $t=q-p$ and $\bar{x}=\sum_{H}\bar{x}^{h}$.

=== Initial equilibrium ===
If the original equilibrium is Pareto optimal, there exists a solution that would increase the government's net income without affecting household utilities. This means that the objective function $R$ is maximized at $t=0$ under the constraint for the government: $I^{h} + \sum a^{hf} \pi^{f} = E^{h}$.

Then considering the toral derivative of the constraint, together with the fact that $\frac{dq}{dt}=I_{N-1}+\frac{dp}{dt}$, yields

$$\frac{\partial E^{h}}{\partial q} + (\frac{\partial E^{h}}{\partial q} - \sum_{f}a^{hf} \frac{\partial \pi^{f}}{\partial p})\frac{dp}{dt}= \frac{dI^{h}}{dt}
+ (\sum_{F}a^{hf}\frac{\partial \pi^{f}}{\partial z} \frac{dz^{f}}{dt} - \frac{\partial E^{h}}{\partial z} \frac{dz^{h} }{dt} )$$

Given that $\sum_{h}a^{hf}=1$, the first derivative of the constraint is summed over all households

$$\bar{x} + (\bar{x} - \bar{y}) \frac{dp}{dt}= \sum_{H} \frac{dI^{h}}{dt} + (\Pi - B)$$

with technological externalities $\Pi = \sum_{F} \frac{\partial \pi^{f}_{*}}{\partial z^{f}} \frac{dz^{f}}{dt}$ and $B=\sum_{H} \frac{\partial E^{h}}{\partial z^{h}}\frac{dz^{h}}{dt}$. Furthermore, the bracket term becomes zero as $\bar{x}=\bar{y}$ in any market equilibrium, and it is presented as

$$\sum_{H}\frac{dI^{h}}{dt}=\bar{x} - (\Pi - B)$$

Then, the first derivative of the objective function is

$$\frac{dR}{dt}=\frac{d\bar{x}}{dt} \cdot t + \Pi - B$$

The necessary condition for the system to be optimal at the initial equilibrium is:

$$\frac{dR}{dt}= \Pi - B = 0$$

It is therefore apparent that the initial equilibrium is Pareto improved by welfare-improving tax measures unless externalities $\Pi$ and $B$ are compleltely offsetting.

== Pareto inefficiency ==
The Greenwald-Stiglitz theorem presents a range of real-world examples demonstrating that government intervention can improve Pareto efficiency, thereby rendering the Fundamental Theorem of Welfare Economics less relevant. In the presence of incomplete markets and imperfect information, market outcomes are unlikely to be Pareto optimal, as Adam Smith's Invisible Hand fails to provide a reliable framework for understanding economic phenomena. In fact, empirical evidence suggests that the Invisible Hand conjecture is not supported by real-world observations, including unemployment, wage rigidity, and inefficient market outcomes.

=== Unemployment ===
The prevailing view of unemployment, posited by Adam Smith, posits that individuals' pursuit of self-interest would lead to Pareto efficiency. However, macroeconomic evidence contradicts this notion, highlighting the existence of unemployment (e.g. Great Depression) and its consequences for real wages, employment, and output. Paul Samuelson's Neoclassical synthesis, an extension of the Invisible Hand conjecture, fails to explain unemployment, wage rigidity, and the Pareto-efficient elimination of unemployment.

=== Imperfect information and incomplete markets ===
It is argued that imperfect information and incomplete markets provide in part explanation for unemployment, as well as for various institutional features of the economy, such as sharecropping, credit rationing, and equity rationing. These phenomena, which are otherwise challenging to explain, can be understood as resulting from the limitations and inefficiencies inherent in these market structures.

==== Risk markets ====
Greenwald, Stiglitz, and Arnott propose a scenario in which the private sector possesses complete information about individual consumption patterns and insurance purchases, despite the unobservability of effort. In this hypothetical scenario, the market would be Pareto efficient. However, even in the presence of observable aggregate sales of commodities like cigarettes, private insurance firms would face difficulties in enforcing their preferred pricing structures, as individuals could simply purchase cigarettes from alternative sources. Furthermore, even if all insurance companies agreed on a uniform tax rate and sought to take over the cigarette industry, they would be unable to prevent the entry of new firms. In contrast, governments possess the power to regulate entry and enforce taxes, highlighting the importance of government intervention in market outcomes.

=== Technological change ===
Technological change arises from processes where firms invest in research and development, leading to new products, technological innovations, and reduced production costs. This process is characterized by imperfect competition, as industries that invest heavily in R&D will naturally be imperfectly competitive. Neither Adam Smith nor Joseph Schumpeter discussed Pareto efficiency in the context of technological change, which is not addressed by the Fundamental Theorem of Welfare Economics.

=== Human nature ===
From a human nature perspective, economic behavior is influenced by two factors: human fallibility, and sociability. The two have a persistent and profound impact on economic behavior, as individuals have cognitive limitations that lead to mistakes. This underscores the importance of organizational decision-making processes and the individuals involved. Furthermore, the distribution of power and authority within an organization is crucial, as those in charge often devote considerable attention to these matters. Humans are also inherently social creatures, and their relationships with others have a significant impact on their behavior. Empirical evidence supports the notion that individuals' perceptions of fairness in their treatment affect their work performance. Moreover, individuals engage in social comparisons, comparing their wages to those of their peers within their social circle, which has important implications for wage levels and distribution within firms.

== See also ==
- Incomplete markets
- Invisible hand
