= Value averaging =

Investment technique

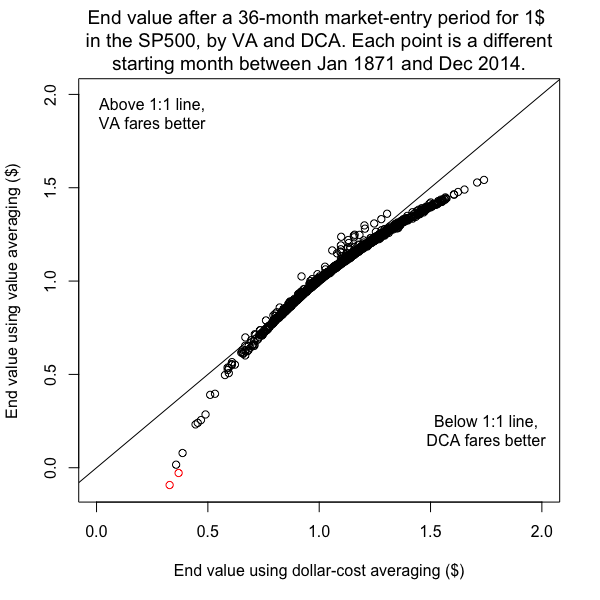
The end value after a 36-month market-entry period for $1 in the SP500, using alternatively value averaging (VA) and dollar cost averaging (DCA), with an expected rate of return (ERR) of zero (above) and 4.35% per year (below). Each point is a different starting month between January 1871 and December 2014. In the ERR-zero case, VA finishes with more wealth than DCA 39% of the time, in those cases yielding an average advantage of 0.87%. The DCA finishes with more wealth than VA 61% of the time, in those cases with an average advantage of 3.2%. VA has a non-zero risk of total ruin. The red points are those for which the investor using VA finishes the market-entry period with less than nothing, losing 100% of the money and contracting debts.

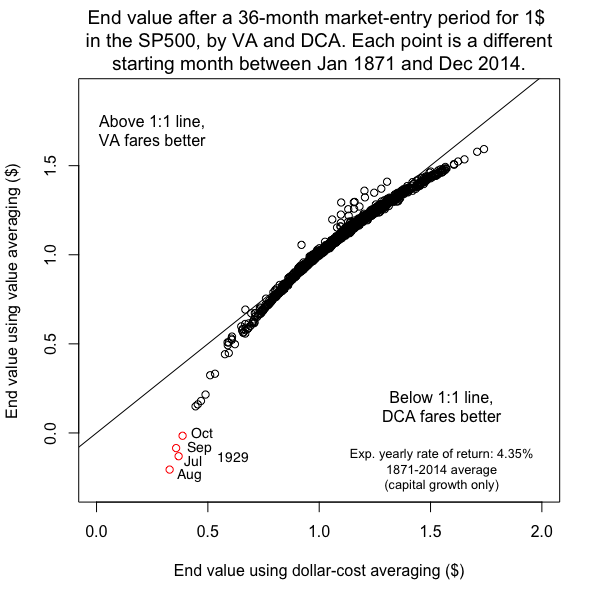
Using an expected rate of return of 4.35% per year (1871-2014 average, excluding dividends).

Value averaging (VA), also known as dollar value averaging (DVA), is a technique for adding to an investment portfolio that is controversially claimed to provide a greater return than other methods such as dollar cost averaging. With the method, investors add to (or withdraw from) their portfolios in such a way that the portfolio balance reaches a predetermined monthly or quarterly target, regardless of market fluctuations. For example, an investor may want to have a $3600 investment in 36 months. Using VA, the investor would aim to have a total investment value of $100 at the beginning of the first month, $200 at the beginning of the second month, and so on. Having invested $100 at the beginning of the first month, the investment may be worth $101 at the end of that month. In that case, the investor invests a further $99 to reach the second month objective of $200. If at the end of the first month, the investment is worth $205, the investor withdraws $5.

The idea of VA is that in periods of market decline, the investor contributes more, while in periods of market climb, the investor contributes less. As illustrated in the above example, in contrast to dollar cost averaging, which mandates that a fixed amount of money be invested at each period, the value averaging investor may on occasion be required to withdraw from the portfolio to keep to the program. Value averaging was developed by former Harvard University professor Michael E. Edleson.

The investor must provide the expected rate of return to the value averaging formula. The inclusion of this piece of information is claimed to allow the value averaging formula to identify periods of investment over-performance and under-performance versus expectations. If the investment grows faster than expected, the investor will be required to buy less or sell. If the investment grows slower than expected or shrinks, the investor will be required to buy more.

Some research suggests that the method results in higher returns at a similar risk, especially for high market variability and long time horizons. Other research suggests that VA offers no benefit at all in dollar terms, claiming that the rate-of-return benefit of VA is illusory because it is mathematically biased, retrospectively giving more weight to past returns if they were strong and less weight if they were weak.

== Endorsement ==
Michael E. Edleson and Paul S. Marshall argue that value averaging can provide for an increased rate of return when compared to dollar cost averaging and other investment techniques. Professor Edleson recommends a VA period of three years. He suggests an infusion or withdrawal of capital every three or six months. For example, if one were to win or be bequeathed one million dollars, roughly 8.33 percent, with the exact amount being set by the formula, could be invested every quarter. The quarterly or semiannual amount can vary greatly, even resulting in a withdrawal, as mentioned above. Opponents argue that this misses the opportunity of already being fully invested when a large market upswing occurs. This argument against value averaging and dollar cost averaging and in favor of lump sum investing ignores the suggestion of Ben Stein and Phil DeMuth that it is more important to avoid a large market downswing, which is theoretically equally possible, since market movements are essentially unpredictable. Participating early on in a large market downswing has been shown to be devastating to the success of long term retirement, for example.

Author Timothy J. McManaman further outlines the benefits of Value Averaging when applied to the popular 401(k) tax qualified investment vehicle. As stated in McManaman's book, Building a 401(k) Fortune, Value Averaging a 401(k) is a precise method of making periodic internal transfers between Equity and Money Market funds within a 401(k) to take advantage of market fluctuations. This is accomplished by initiating minor movements out of Equity funds when the overall market trends higher and back into Equity funds when the market moves lower. It is essentially buying fund shares at a lower base price and selling them a higher base price within a tax qualified 401(k) on a monthly or quarterly interval.

== Criticism ==
Edleson and Marshall base their claim that VA outperforms other strategies on the fact that it generates a consistently higher Internal Rate of Return (IRR). According to Hayley (2013), however, the IRR is a misleading measure of returns for strategies such as VA. These strategies systematically invest less after strong returns than they do after weak returns. This makes the IRR calculation put more weight on earlier returns when they were high and less when they were low. This is a retrospective change (as VA invests more after poor returns), so while it alters the measured IRR it doesn't generate more wealth for the investor.

The study claims to demonstrate mathematically that VA is an inefficient investment strategy since the same outturns can be generated using other strategies which require less total cash to be invested. In addition, compared to other strategies, VA requires more active management, and a large "side fund" of cash or liquid assets which can be used to make the periodic investments required by VA. It concludes that "VA's popularity appears to be due to investors making a cognitive error in assuming that its higher IRR implies higher expected profits".

The study accepts that VA will tend to outperform when there is mean reversion in market returns (e.g. a high return one month tends to be followed by a low return the following month). But even if an investor identifies a market which mean-reverts, VA is unlikely to be the best strategy to use. Consistent mean reversion would mean that market returns are easy to forecast, so it would be easy to construct other strategies which would take advantage of this predictability more effectively than VA. Mean reversion in the market is not the same concept as regression to the mean as used by statisticians where retesting a non-random sample of a population tends to produce results that are closer to the mean than the original test. The existence of mean reversion in financial markets is controversial and is a subject of active research. If it exists, then it is almost certainly very slight.

Independent of the issue of mean reversion, the cash side account required for value averaging will always cause some amount of reduced return on the overall portfolio since the money in the cash account, on average, will be earning less than if it was in the main portfolio. Any benefits that value averaging provides in terms of market timing need to overcome this factor.

Because value averaging sometimes calls for the sale of assets even during an overall accumulation phase, there can potentially be additional transaction costs and restrictions. For example, some mutual funds have frequent trader policies. Some funds forbid additional investment in the fund within N months of a redemption from the fund. Some funds charge an additional fee for a redemption if there has been an investment in the last N months.

== Sources ==
- Marshall, Paul S. (Spring 2000). "A Statistical Comparison of Value Averaging vs. Dollar Cost Averaging and Random Investment Techniques" (PDF). Journal of Financial and Strategic Decisions. 13 (1): 87–99.
- Timothy J. McManaman, Building a 401(k) Fortune, 2008 ISBN 978-1-4343-9182-7
- Hayley, S (2013). "Value Averaging and How Dynamic Strategies Bias the IRR and Modified IRR" (PDF). doi:10.2139/ssrn.1606347.
- Hicks, C. (2017, Sept 26). "Value Averaging: An Investing Strategy to Avoid".
- Building A 401(k) Fortune, by Timothy J. McManaman
- Value averaging basics from CNN Money
- A detailed overview of the value averaging technique from Sigma Investing
- Value Averaging: The Safe and Easy Strategy for Higher Investment Returns, by Michael E. Edleson. ISBN 0-470-04977-4
- Calculator
