= Michael F. Price =

American value investor and fund manager (1951–2022)

- Born: July 3, 1951; Glen Cove, New York, U.S.
- Died: March 14, 2022 (aged 70)
- Education: University of Oklahoma (BA)
- Occupations: Investor and fund manager
- Children: 6

Michael F. Price (July 3, 1951 – March 14, 2022) was an American value investor and fund manager who ran the hedge fund MFP Investors LLC.

== Early life and education ==
Price was born on July 3, 1951, to a Jewish family in Glen Cove, New York. His father ran a chain of clothing stores. In 1973, he earned a B.A. from the University of Oklahoma.

== Career ==
In 1974, he accepted a job with Max Heine at Mutual Series. In 1982, he became a full partner and when Heine died in 1988, became the president and chairman. In 1995, with his mutual fund, he famously took a position in Chase Manhattan Bank of 11 million shares or 6.1% of their stock to force them "to sell divisions or take other actions" to find a buyer to elevate the value of their stock. Chase ultimately was sold to Chemical Banking Corp. on August 28, in a deal valued at more than $10 billion and 70% higher than his initial purchases. In 1996, Mutual Series was merged into Franklin Templeton Investments. In 1998, Price stepped down from day-to-day fund management duties but continued as chairman of the company, and in 2001, he left the firm to begin his own fund company, MFP Partners, LP.

== Philanthropy ==
Price donated tens of millions of dollars to his alma mater, the University of Oklahoma. The OU College of Business, one of its buildings, and a large endowment bear his name. The CGTM, which officially opened in June 2008 at the Albert Einstein College of Medicine in the Bronx, bears his name too.

== Personal life ==
Price was married and has six children. He has been a summer resident of Bay Head, New Jersey.

Often included in the Forbes 400, Price disputed this claim to his net worth, stating "You guys make things up about people every year, so you can keep making things up about me."

He died following a lengthy illness on March 14, 2022, at the age of 70.
