= Margin of safety (financial) =

Stock market pricing concept

A margin of safety (or safety margin) is the difference between the intrinsic value of a stock and its market price.

Another definition: In break-even analysis, from the discipline of accounting, margin of safety is how much output or sales level can fall before a business reaches its break-even point. Break-even point is a no-profit, no-loss scenario.

== History ==
Benjamin Graham and David Dodd, founders of value investing, coined the term margin of safety in their seminal 1934 book, Security Analysis. The term is also described in Graham's The Intelligent Investor. Graham said that "the margin of safety is always dependent on the price paid".

== Application to investing ==
Using margin of safety, one should buy a stock when it is worth more than its price in the market. This is the central thesis of value investing philosophy which espouses preservation of capital as its first rule of investing. Benjamin Graham suggested to look at unpopular or neglected companies with low P/E and P/B ratios. One should also analyze financial statements and footnotes to understand whether companies have hidden assets (e.g., investments in other companies) that are potentially unnoticed by the market.

The margin of safety protects the investor from both poor decisions and downturns in the market. Because fair value is difficult to accurately compute, the margin of safety gives the investor room for investing. Warren Buffett famously analogized margin of safety to driving across a bridge:

You have to have the knowledge to enable you to make a very general estimate about the value of the underlying business. But you do not cut it close. That is what Ben Graham meant by having a margin of safety. You don’t try to buy businesses worth $83 million for $80 million. You leave yourself an enormous margin. When you build a bridge, you insist it can carry 30,000 pounds, but you only drive 10,000 pound trucks across it. And that same principle works in investing.

A common interpretation of margin of safety is how far below intrinsic value one is paying for a stock. For high quality issues, value investors typically want to pay 90 cents for a dollar (90% of intrinsic value) while more speculative stocks should be purchased for up to a 50 percent discount to intrinsic value (pay 50 cents for a dollar).

== Application to accounting ==
In accounting parlance, margin of safety is the difference between the expected (or actual) sales level and the breakeven sales level. It can be expressed in the equation form as follows:

Margin of Safety = Expected (or) Actual Sales Level (quantity or dollar amount) - Breakeven sales Level (quantity or dollar amount)

The measure is especially useful in situations where large portions of a company's sales are at risk, such as when they are tied up in a single customer contract that may be canceled.

== Formula ==
Margin of Safety = Budgeted Sales - Breakeven Sales Or Total sale - sale of breakeven point

To express it as a percentage, the Margin of Safety needs to be divided by Budgeted sales.

== See also ==
- Mr. Market
