= The Intelligent Investor =

1949 book by Benjamin Graham

- First edition
- Author: Benjamin Graham
- Cover artist: Donavan Hayes
- Language: English
- Subject: Securities, investment
- Publisher: Harper & Brothers
- Publication date: 1949
- Publication place: United States
- Pages: 640
- ISBN: 0-06-055566-1 (2008 edition)
- OCLC: 1723191
- LC Class: HG4521 .G665

The Intelligent Investor by Benjamin Graham, first published in 1949, is a widely acclaimed book on value investing. The book provides strategies on how to successfully use value investing in the stock market. Historically, the book has been one of the most popular books on investing and Graham's legacy remains.

== Background and history ==
The Intelligent Investor is based on value investing, an investment approach Graham began teaching at Columbia Business School in 1928 and subsequently refined with David Dodd. This sentiment was echoed by other Graham disciples such as Irving Kahn and Walter Schloss. Warren Buffett read the book at age 20 and began using the value investing taught by Graham to build his own investment portfolio.

The Intelligent Investor also marks a significant deviation in stock selection from Graham's earlier works, such as Security Analysis. Instead of extensive analysis on an individual company, The Intelligent Investor advocates applying earning criteria as a guide to buying a group of companies. He explained the change as:

The thing that I have been emphasizing in my own work for the last few years has been the group approach. To try to buy groups of stocks that meet some simple criterion for being undervalued -- regardless of the industry and with very little attention to the individual company... I found the results were very good for 50 years. They certainly did twice as well as the Dow Jones. And so my enthusiasm has been transferred from the selective to the group approach. What I want is an earnings ratio twice as good as the bond interest ratio typically for most years. One can also apply a dividend criterion or an asset value criterion and get good results. My research indicates the best results come from simple earnings criterions.

== Analysis ==
=== Value investing ===
Graham’s main investment approach outlined in The Intelligent Investor is that of value investing. Value investing is an investment strategy that targets undervalued stocks of companies that have the capabilities as businesses to perform well in the long run. Value investing is not concerned with short term trends in the market or daily movements of stocks. This is because value investing strategies believe the market overreacts to price changes in the short term, without taking into account a company’s fundamentals for long-term growth. In its most basic terms, value investing is based on the premise that if you know the true value of a stock, then you can save lots of money if you can buy that stock on sale.

=== Mr. Market ===
One of Graham's important allegories is that of Mr. Market, meant to personify the irrationality and group-think of the stock market. Mr. Market is an obliging fellow who turns up every day at the shareholder's door offering to buy or sell his shares at a different price. Often, the price quoted by Mr. Market seems plausible, but sometimes it is ridiculous. The investor is free to either agree with his quoted price and trade with him, or ignore him completely. Mr. Market doesn't mind this, and will be back the following day to quote another price.

The point of this anecdote is that the investor should not regard the whims of Mr. Market as a determining factor in the value of the shares the investor owns. He should profit from market folly rather than participate in it. A common fallacy in the market is that investors are reasonable and homogenous, but Mr. Market serves to show that this is not the case. The investor is advised to concentrate on the real life performance of his companies and receiving dividends, rather than be too concerned with Mr. Market's often irrational behavior.

=== Determining value ===
In The Intelligent Investor, Graham explains the importance of determining value when investing. In order to invest for value successfully and avoid participating in short-term market booms and busts, determining the value of companies is essential. To determine value, investors use fundamental analysis. Mathematically, by multiplying forecasted earnings over a certain number of years times a capitalization factor of a company, value can be determined and then compared to the actual price of a stock. There are five factors that are included in determining the capitalization factor, which are long-term growth prospects, quality of management, financial strength and capital structure, dividend record, and current dividend rate. To understand these factors, value investors look at a company's financials, such as annual reports, cash flow statements and EBITDA, and company executives’s forecasts and performance. This information is all available online as it is required for each public company by the SEC.

== Reception ==
Benjamin Graham is regarded as the father of value investing and The Intelligent Investor was highly regarded by the public and remains so. Ronald Moy, professor of economics and finance at St. John’s University, explains that “The influence of Graham's methodology is indisputable. His disciples represent a virtual who's who of value investors, including Warren Buffett, Bill Ruane, and Walter Schloss”. Warren Buffett is regarded as a brilliant investor and Graham’s best-known disciple. According to Buffett, The Intelligent Investor is “By far the best book on investing ever written.” Ken Faulkberry, founder of Arbor Investment Planner, claims, “If you could only buy one investment book in your lifetime, this would probably be the one”. Many of Graham’s investment strategies explained in the book remain useful today despite massive growth and change in the economy. Scholar Kenneth D. Roose of Oberlin College writes, “Graham’s book continues to provide one of the clearest, most readable, and wisest discussions of the problems of the average investor”. The Intelligent Investor was received with praise from economic scholars and everyday investors and continues to be a premier investing book today.

== Editions ==
Since the work was published in 1949 Graham revised it several times, most recently in 1971–72. This was published in 1973 as the "Fourth Revised Edition" ISBN 0-06-015547-7, and it included a preface and appendices by Warren Buffett. Graham died in 1976. Commentaries and new footnotes were added to the fourth edition by Jason Zweig, and this new revision was published in 2003.

- The Intelligent Investor (Re-issue of the 1949 edition) by Benjamin Graham. Collins, 2005, 269 pages. ISBN 0-06-075261-0.
- The Intelligent Investor by Benjamin Graham, 1949, 1954, 1959, 1965(Library of Congress Catalog Card Number 64-7552) by Harper & Row Publishers Inc, New York.
- The Intelligent Investor (Revised 1973 edition) by Benjamin Graham and Jason Zweig. HarperBusiness Essentials, 2003, 640 pages. ISBN 0-06-055566-1.
- The Intelligent Investor (3rd Revised Edition) by Benjamin Graham and Jason Zweig. Harper Business, 2024, 640 pages. ISBN 9780063356733.

An unabridged audio version of the Revised Edition of The Intelligent Investor was also released on July 7, 2015.

== Book contents ==
2003 edition

- Introduction: What This Book Expects to Accomplish
- Commentary on the Introduction
1. Investment versus Speculation: Results to Be Expected by the Intelligent Investor
2. The Investor and Inflation
3. A Century of Stock Market History: The Level of Stock Market Prices in Early 1972
4. General Portfolio Policy: The Defensive Investor
5. The Defensive Investor and Common Stocks
6. Portfolio Policy for the Enterprising Investor: Negative Approach
7. Portfolio Policy for the Enterprising Investor: The Positive Side
8. The Investor and Market Fluctuations
9. Investing in Investment Funds
10. The Investor and His Advisers
11. Security Analysis for the Lay Investor: General Approach
12. Things to Consider About Per-Share Earnings
13. A Comparison of Four Listed Companies
14. Stock Selection for the Defensive Investor
15. Stock Selection for the Enterprising Investor
16. Convertible Issues and Warrants
17. Four Extremely Instructive Case Histories and more
18. A Comparison of Eight Pairs of Companies
19. Shareholders and Managements: Dividend Policy
20. "Margin of Safety" as the Central Concept of Investment
- Postscript
- Commentary on Postscript
- Appendixes
1. The Superinvestors of Graham-and-Doddsville
2. Important Rules Concerning Taxability of Investment Income and Security Transactions (in 1972)
3. The Basics of Investment Taxation (Updated as of 2003)
4. The New Speculation in Common Stocks
5. A Case History: Aetna Maintenance Co.
6. Tax Accounting for NVF's Acquisition of Sharon Steel Shares
7. Technological Companies as Investments
- Endnotes
- Index

== See also ==
- Benjamin Graham formula
- Market Rules to Remember
- Security Analysis (book)
- Jason Zweig
- Benjamin Graham
