= Security Analysis (book) =

1934 book by Benjamin Graham

- Author: Benjamin Graham and David Dodd
- Language: English
- Subject: Finance, investing
- Publisher: Whittlesey House, McGraw-Hill Book Co.
- Publication date: 1934
- Publication place: United States
- Pages: 725
- ISBN: 0-07-144820-9 (2005 edition)
- OCLC: 2140220
- Dewey Decimal: 332.63/2042/0973 22
- LC Class: HG4521 .G67 1934

Security Analysis is a book written by Benjamin Graham and David Dodd and first published in 1934. Both authors were professors at the Columbia Business School. The book laid the intellectual foundation for value investing, and is widely cited as influential for investing and finance.

In the book, Graham and Dodd popularized a number of important terms and concepts including a distinction between investing and speculating; the emotional overreactions of investors as personified with Mr. Market; the idea of intrinsic value as distinct from price for a given asset; and the term margin of safety to increase the odds of successfully exploiting gaps between price and value with reduced risk.

== History ==
Security Analysis was published by McGraw-Hill, and written by David Dodd and Benjamin Graham in the early 1930s, when both authors taught at Columbia University's business school. Writes The New York Times, "it was intended as a common-sense guide for investors but turned out to be a thick textbook that went through five editions and sold more than 250,000 copies [by 1988]."

Economist Irving Kahn was one of Graham's teaching assistants at Columbia University in the 1930s, and made research contributions to Graham's texts for Security Analysis.

== Content ==
=== First edition ===
The work was first published in 1934, following unprecedented losses on Wall Street in the early years of the Great Depression. In summing up lessons learned, Graham and Dodd scolded prevailing thought on Wall Street for its focus on a company's reported earnings per share, and were particularly harsh on the favored "earnings trends." They encouraged investors to take an entirely different approach by gauging the rough value of the operating business that lay behind the security. Graham and Dodd enumerated multiple actual examples of the market's tendency to irrationally under-value certain out-of-favor securities. They saw this tendency as an opportunity for the savvy.

In Security Analysis, Graham proposed a clear definition of investment that was distinguished from what he deemed speculation. It read, "An investment operation is one which, upon thorough analysis, promises safety of principal and an adequate return. Operations not meeting these requirements are speculative."

A number of financial terms were coined in the book. For example, Graham and Dodd coined the term margin of safety in Security Analysis. It is not known when the Period of financial distress phrase was first used or by whom. However, it or phrases closely equivalent were almost certainly first used in connection with the theory of value investing as developed initially by Graham in Security Analysis in 1934.

=== Later editions ===
Starting in 1962, Benjamin Graham describes in the fourth and subsequent editions a heuristic he used to value stocks first stated in his 1949 book, The Intelligent Investor, as follows:

$$V = \text{EARNINGS} \times (8.5 + 2g)$$

V = Intrinsic Value
EARNINGS = Trailing Twelve Months Earnings
8.5 = P/E base for a no-growth company
g = reasonably expected 7 to 10 year growth rate

Graham’s formula took no account of prevailing interest rates.

== Market application ==
The book represents the genesis of financial analysis and corporate finance. However, by the 1970s, Graham stopped advocating a careful use of the techniques described in his text for security analysts in selecting individual stock investments, citing that "in the light of the enormous amount of research now being carried on, I doubt whether in most cases such extensive efforts will generate sufficiently superior selections to justify their cost. To that very limited extent I'm on the side of the "efficient market" school of thought now generally accepted by the professors." Graham stated that the average manager of institutional funds could not obtain better results than stock market indexes, since "that would mean that the stock market experts as a whole could beat themselves — a logical contradiction." Regarding portfolio formation, Graham suggested that investors use "a highly simplified" approach that applies one or two criteria to security prices "to assure that full value is present," relying on the portfolio as a whole rather than on individual securities.

== Reception and impact ==
"The Superinvestors of Graham-and-Doddsville" is a 1984 article by Warren Buffett promoting value investing, which was based on a speech given on May 17, 1984, at the Columbia University School of Business in honor of the 50th anniversary of the publication of Security Analysis. Using case studies, the speech and article challenged the idea that equity markets are efficient. Buffett brought up 9 investors whom he considered direct protegés of Graham and Dodd, and using their finances, then argued that "these Graham-and-Doddsville investors have successfully exploited gaps between price and value," despite the inefficiency and "nonsensical" nature of the pricing of the overall market. Buffett concluded in the 1984 article that "some of the more commercially minded among you may wonder why I am writing this article. Adding many converts to the value approach will perforce narrow the spreads between price and value. I can only tell you that the secret has been out for 50 years, ever since Ben Graham and Dave Dodd wrote Security Analysis, yet I have seen no trend toward value investing in the 35 years I've practiced it. There seems to be some perverse human characteristic that likes to make easy things difficult. The academic world, if anything, has actually backed away from the teaching of value investing over the last 30 years. It's likely to continue that way. Ships will sail around the world but the Flat Earth Society will flourish. There will continue to be wide discrepancies between price and value in the marketplace, and those who read their Graham & Dodd will continue to prosper."

The CFA Institute in 2012 wrote that "The roots of value investing can be traced back to the 1934 publication of Benjamin Graham and David Dodd’s classic, Security Analysis. Graham later disseminated his views to the general public in the highly regarded book The Intelligent Investor. The influence of Graham’s methodology is indisputable." In 2015, The Wall Street Journal wrote that Security Analysis "is widely viewed as the urtext of modern value investing. The long-held idea is that some stocks trade significantly below an identified “intrinsic value” and can be bought at a discount, with a built-in margin of safety against a complete washout." In 2016, Fortune called the book "still the best investment guide" and noted its "extraordinary endurance." The article states that "Graham, the primary author, then an obscure professor and money manager, chose the Great Depression as the time to assert his faith in patient security analysis and long-term investing. Given that the market was in the throes of an epochal collapse, very few folks were interested in investing. But Graham had the courage to see through the moment." Fortune also argues that one reason the book remained popular is that "it proffered an irreplaceable approach to investment. Stocks were to be valued as a shares of a business, bought and sold on that basis. No one contemplating the purchase of a family farm pondered the market trend or the latest jobs report; so should it be with common stocks."

== Domestic editions ==
- 1st ed. (1934) Whittlesey House (the trade division of McGraw-Hill) - LCCN: 34023635

Black bound cover (1st printing) was printed by The Maple Press Co., York, PA, for a small distribution in the United States
Maroon bound cover (2nd printing) was published that same year for sale abroad, The Maple Press Co., York, PA

- 2nd ed. (1940) McGraw-Hill - LCCN: 40013028
- 3rd ed. (January 1, 1951) McGraw-Hill (last edition while Graham & Dodd were faculty members of Columbia) Charles Tatham, Jr., joins as collaborator on utility company valuation - LCCN: 2005270180
- 4th ed. (1962) McGraw-Hill (last edition by Graham & Dodd) Charles Sidney Cottle (1910–1987) joins as coauthor - LCCN: 62017368

Reprint 3rd ed. (May 1976) McGraw-Hill - ISBN 0-07-023957-6

- 5th ed. (January 1, 1988) McGraw-Hill (updated by Cottle, Murray, and Block) - ISBN 0-07-013235-6

Reprint 1st ed. (October 1, 1996) McGraw-Hill - ISBN 0-07-024496-0
Reprint 1st ed. (February 1, 1997) McGraw-Hill - ISBN 0-07-024497-9
Reprint 2nd ed. (October 10, 2002) McGraw-Hill - ISBN 0-07-141228-X
Reprint 3rd ed. (December 10, 2004) McGraw-Hill - ISBN 0-07-144820-9

- 6th ed. (September 4, 2008) McGraw-Hill (updated with commentary by 10 contributors) - ISBN 0-07-159253-9

Limited Leatherbound Edition (September 19, 2008) McGraw-Hill - ISBN 0-07-162357-4

- 7th ed. (June 27, 2023) McGraw-Hill ISBN 0-07-162357-4, 1264932405

== See also ==
- Stock selection criterion
- The Warren Buffett Way
- The Snowball: Warren Buffett and the Business of Life
- Value investing
- The Superinvestors of Graham-and-Doddsville
- The Intelligent Investor (second book by Graham)
