= Irving Kahn =

American investor and philanthropist

- Born: December 19, 1905; New York City, U.S.
- Died: February 24, 2015 (aged 109); New York City, U.S.
- Education: City College of New York
- Occupations: Investor and philanthropist
- Known for: Advising the Kahn Brothers Group

Irving Kahn (December 19, 1905 – February 24, 2015) was an American investor and philanthropist. He was the oldest living active investor. He was an early disciple of Benjamin Graham, who popularized the value investing methodology. Kahn began his career in 1928 and continued to work until his death. He was chairman of Kahn Brothers Group, Inc., the privately owned investment advisory and broker-dealer firm that he founded with his sons, Thomas and Alan, in 1978.

Kahn was the oldest active money manager on Wall Street. He made his first trade—a short sale of a copper mining company—in the summer of 1929, months before the famous market crash in October of the same year.

== Investment career ==
In a magazine article in 2002, he was quoted as saying: "I'm at the stage in life where I get a lot of pleasure out of finding a cheap stock," adding that his research still pushed him to work evenings and weekends. His son Thomas, then and still currently president of Kahn Brothers Group, said, "My father continues to research ideas and talk to companies. One of the nice things about this business is that there's no mandatory retirement age, and you allegedly get wiser as you get older."

== Personal life ==
Kahn, his sisters, and his brother were, collectively, the world's oldest living quartet of siblings. Kahn himself lived to 109. His sister, Helen Reichert (1901–2011), nicknamed "Happy", also died at age 109. The youngest sibling, Peter Keane (1910–2014), died at the age of 103.

Kahn outlived his son Donald, who died suddenly on January 16, 2015, at the age of 79.

Irving Kahn died on February 24, 2015, aged 109. His death was reported through a brief obituary in The New York Times on February 26, 2015. No specific cause of death was given.
