= David Dodd =

American educator and economist

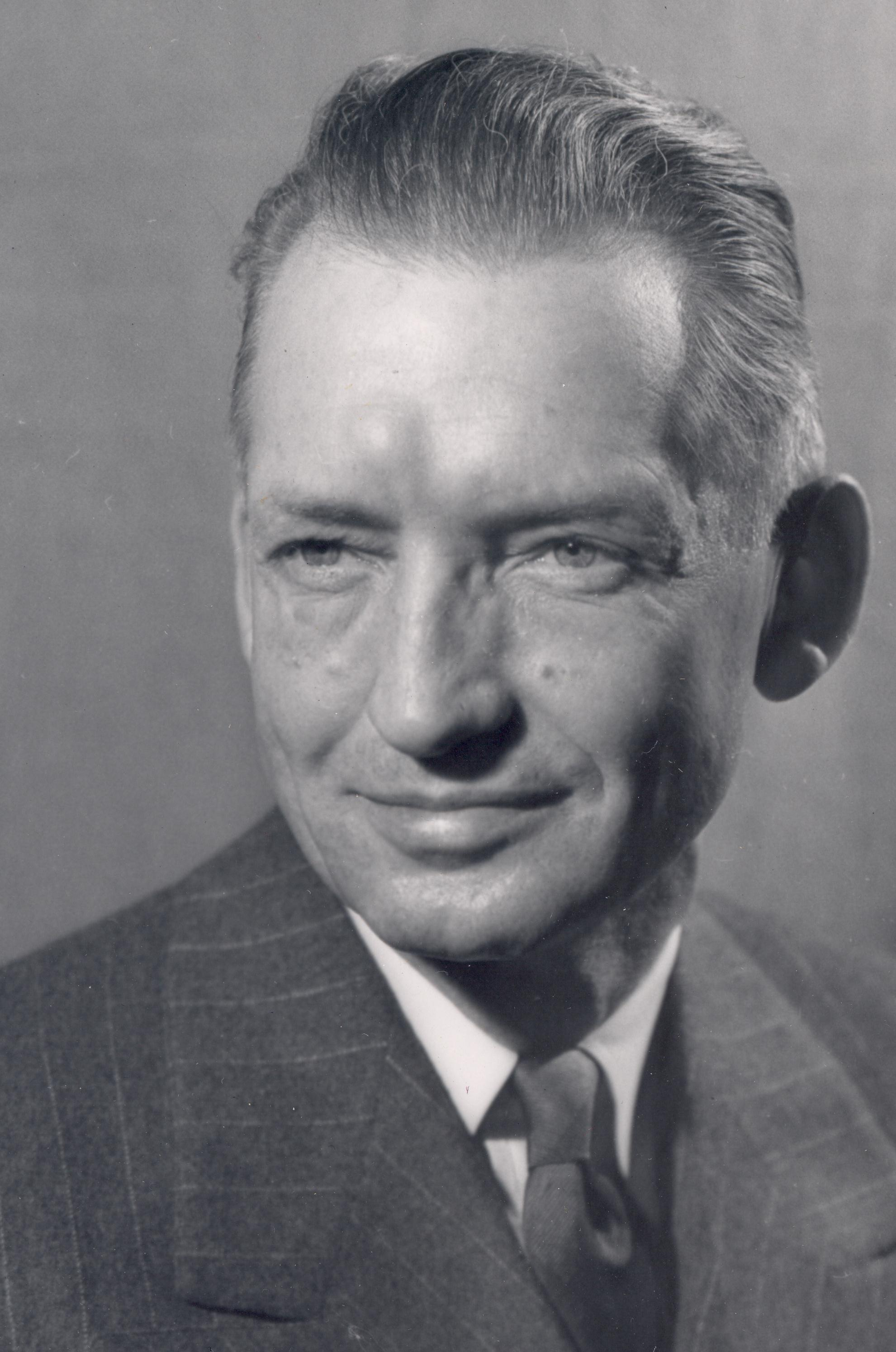
- David Dodd (ca. 1948)
- Born: August 23, 1895; Berkeley County, West Virginia, U.S.
- Died: September 18, 1988 (aged 93); Portland, Maine, U.S.
- Education: University of Pennsylvania; Columbia University
- Known for: Security Analysis
- Spouse: Elsie Marguerite Firor
- Scientific career
- Fields: Investment management, Economics
- Workplaces: Columbia Business School
- Academic advisors: Benjamin Graham

David LeFevre Dodd (August 23, 1895 – September 18, 1988) was an American educator, financial analyst, author, economist, and investor. In his student years, Dodd was a protégé and colleague of Benjamin Graham at Columbia Business School.

The Wall Street crash of 1929 (Black Tuesday) almost wiped out Graham, who had started teaching the year before at his alma mater, Columbia. The crash inspired Graham to search for a more conservative, safer way to invest. Graham agreed to teach with the stipulation that someone take notes. Dodd, then a young instructor at Columbia, volunteered. Those transcriptions served as the basis for a 1934 book Security Analysis, which galvanized the concept of value investing. It is the longest running investment text ever published.

== Early life and education ==
In 1916, Dodd graduated from High Street School, a high school in Martinsburg, West Virginia, where his father was the principal. In 1920, he completed his Bachelor of Science, at University of Pennsylvania. One year later, he received his Master of Science at Columbia University.

== Academic life ==
From 1922 to 1925, Dodd was an instructor of economics at Columbia University. From 1925 to 1930, he became an instructor of finance. From 1926 to 1945, he was in charge of the business and economics courses. In 1930, he received his PhD from Columbia University. From 1930 to 1938, Dodd was an assistant professor there, from 1938 to 1947 an associate professor, and from 1947 to 1961 a full professor. From 1948 to 1952, he was associate dean at the Columbia Business School. In 1961, he retired as professor emeritus in finance at Columbia University. On May 17, 1984, on the 50th anniversary of publishing Security Analysis, Michael I. Sovern, president of Columbia University, awarded Dodd a Doctor of Letters, an honorary degree, for applying financial theories with brilliant results in a highly competitive world of investments. Columbia President Michael Sovern bestowed the honor during Columbia's 230th commencement exercises.

Dodd was a member of the following organizations: American Economic Association, Social Science Research Council (investment committee 1950–1956), American Finance Association (vice president 1946–1947), New York Society of Security Analysts, Beta Gamma Sigma, Phi Gamma Delta, Alpha Kappa Psi, and Phi Chi Theta.

At the time of his death, various editions of the book he coauthored, Security Analysis, had sold over 250,000 copies.

== Professional life ==
From 1917 to 1919, he was in the US Navy during World War I; rising from boatswain to lieutenant. From 1921 to 1922, he was research assistant for an economist at National Bank of Commerce, New York (now part of JPMorgan Chase Bank, National Association; see NYS banking history here). In 1928, he advised private clients on investments. From 1950 to 1958, he was Limited partner, Newman & Graham Ltd. (an unregulated hedge fund). From 1958 to 1959, he was general partner, Graham-Newman & Co. (a regulated investment trust formed in 1929).

=== Value investing ===
The phrases "Graham and Dodd," "value investing," "margin of safety," and "intrinsic value"—all biblical to value investors—are often used interchangeably when referring to an approach to investing. Despite the onset of modern portfolio theory (MPT) in the late 1950s—a theory that peaked throughout the 80s, gaining Nobel recognition in 1990 (co-laureates: Harry Markowitz, Merton Miller, William F. Sharpe)—Value Investing proved to be a formidable style that sharply defied MPT. The University of Chicago was at the center of MPT (see "quantitative analyst") while Columbia has been the Mecca for Value Investing for 7 1/2 decades.

Value Investors see securities as either priced correctly, under-priced, or over-priced. In contrast, MPT proponents insist that, by definition under the efficient-market hypothesis, a realized price of a stock is the correct price. Value investor purists reject the usefulness of capital asset pricing model (CAPM), in part, because it wrongly extrapolates historical volatility as a proxy for risk. For example, if equity prices of a company fell 75%, assuming the underlying fundamentals of the company were solid, an MPT practitioner would view it as volatile (risky); whereas, a value investor would determine whether it was undervalued, and if so, buy it, reasoning that the resulting downward risk is less than before. Therefore, value investors see MPT metrics—such as standard deviation, beta (relative standard deviation), alpha (excess return), and the Sharpe ratio (risk adjusted return)—as inadequate and even misleading.

Columbia resisted de-emphasizing Value Investing during the throes of the MPT renaissance, but the appeal of MPT seemed to be part of a larger movement, thrusting finance aspects of business education into higher echelons of academia. During about a 25-year period (1965–90), published research and articles in leading journals of the value ilk were few. Warren Buffett once commented, "You couldn't advance in a finance department in this country unless you taught that the world was flat." Shortly after the death of David Dodd in 1988, Bruce Greenwald, a star professor at CBS, took a keen interest in Value Investing. He found the overwhelming success of Value investors difficult to dismiss. At the same time, reliable data that fortified Value Investing was solidifying, while MPT was showing some flaws. Professor Greenwald invigorated the academic aspects of what many in ivory towers erstwhile treated as a vocational discipline.

MPT pundits argue that the Warren Buffett's long-term record is a statistical three- to five-sigma event—that is, his success is probable, but not replicable with certainty.

Yet the success of numerous other investment funds and practitioners who applied value investing theories weakened assertions attributing success to chance. Because Value Investing rejects MPT and its use of sophisticated statistics, there's irony when MPT theorists attribute its success to tails of standard deviation. Bruce Greenwald overhauled and relaunched the Value Investing curriculum at Columbia in the spring of 1994. Today, Value Investing enjoys broad appeal among academicians and investors around the world. Professor Greenwald is the Robert Heilbrunn Professor of Finance and Asset Management at Columbia University's Graduate School of Business.

== Personal life ==
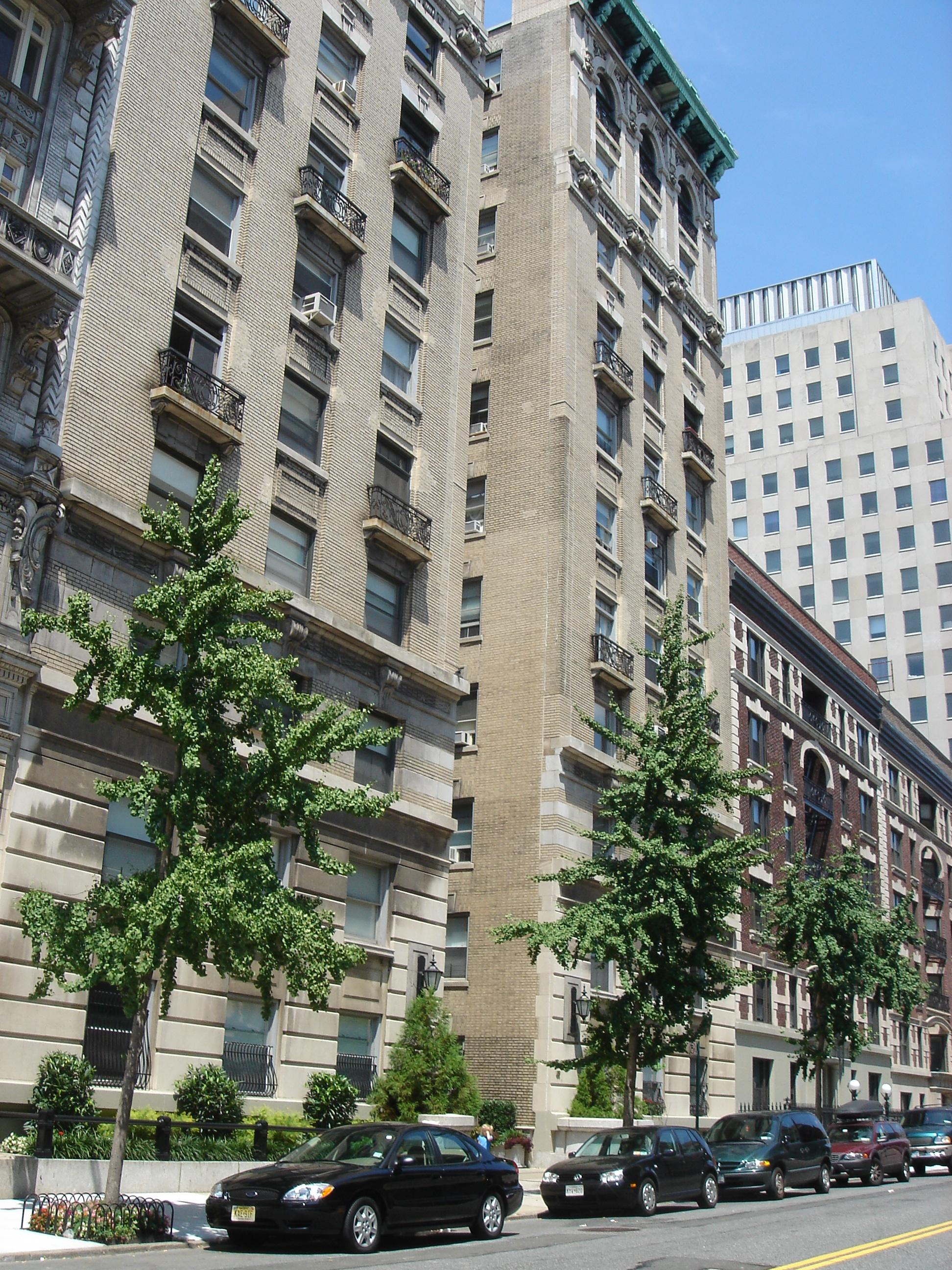
Dodd's residence (1950s – 60s): 39 Claremont Avenue (down the street from Juilliard's former home), Morningside Heights (2006 photo)

On August 9, 1924, he married Elsie Marguerite Firor (Mar 22, 1898 – 22 June 2001).

David Dodd died September 18, 1988, aged 93, of respiratory failure at Maine Medical Center, Portland, Maine. At the time he was living on Chebeague Island, Maine in Casco Bay. His daughter, Barbara Dodd Anderson (1932–2010) lived in Northern California and was a benefactor of the Heilbrunn Center for Graham and Dodd Investing.

== Bibliography ==
- Benjamin Graham & David Dodd (2008) Security Analysis: Sixth Edition, Foreword by Warren Buffett, McGraw-Hill Professional. ISBN 978-0-07-160587-8
- David LeFevre Dodd, Stock Watering: the judicial valuation of property for stock-issue purposes (January 1, 1930), Columbia University Press OCLC 2087269
