= Value investing =

Investment paradigm

Value investing is an investment paradigm that involves buying securities that appear underpriced by some form of fundamental analysis. Modern value investing derives from the investment philosophy taught by Benjamin Graham and David Dodd at Columbia Business School starting in 1928 and subsequently developed in their 1934 text Security Analysis.

The early value opportunities identified by Graham and Dodd included stock in public companies trading at discounts to book value or tangible book value, those with high dividend yields and those having low price-to-earning multiples or low price-to-book ratios.

Proponents of value investing, including Berkshire Hathaway chairman Warren Buffett, have argued that the essence of value investing is buying stocks at less than their intrinsic value. The discount of the market price to the intrinsic value is what Benjamin Graham called the "margin of safety". Buffett further expanded the value investing concept with a focus on "finding an outstanding company at a sensible price" rather than generic companies at a bargain price. Hedge fund manager Seth Klarman has described value investing as rooted in a rejection of the efficient-market hypothesis (EMH). While the EMH proposes that securities are accurately priced based on all available data, value investing proposes that some equities are not accurately priced.

Graham himself did not use the phrase value investing. The term was coined later to help describe his ideas. The term has also led to misinterpretation of his principles - most notably the notion that Graham simply recommended cheap stocks.

== History ==
=== Early predecessors ===
The concept of intrinsic value for equities was recognized as early as the 1600s, as was the idea that paying substantially above intrinsic value was likely to be a poor long-term investment. Daniel Defoe observed in the 1690s how stock for the East India Company was trading at what he believed was an elevated price of over 300% more than face value, "without any material difference in Intrinsick [sic] value."

Hetty Green (1834-1916) was retrospectively described as "America's first value investor." She had a habit of buying unwanted assets at low prices, which she held, as she stated in 1905, "until they go up [in price] and people are anxious to buy."

The investing firm Tweedy, Browne was founded in 1920 and has been described as "the oldest value investing firm on Wall Street". Founder Forest Berwind "Bill" Tweedy initially focused on shares of smaller companies, often family owned, which traded in lower numbers and lower volume than stock for larger companies. This niche allowed Tweedy to buy stocks at a significant discount to estimated book value due to the limited options for sellers. Tweedy and Benjamin Graham eventually became friends and worked out of the same New York City office building at 52 broadway.

Economist John Maynard Keynes is also recognized as an early value investor. While managing the endowment of King's College, Cambridge starting in the 1920s, Keynes first attempted a stock trading strategy based on market timing. When this method was unsuccessful, he turned to a strategy similar to value investing. In 2017, Joel Tillinghast of Fidelity Investments wrote:

Instead of using big-picture economics, Keynes increasingly focused on a small number of companies that he knew very well. Rather than chasing momentum, he bought undervalued stocks with generous dividends. [...] Most were small and midsize companies in dull or out of favor industries, such as mining and autos in the midst of the Great Depression. Despite his rough start [by timing markets], Keynes beat the market averages by 6 percent a year over more than two decades.

Keynes used similar terms and concepts as Graham and Dodd (e.g. an emphasis on the intrinsic value of equities). A review of his archives at King's College found no evidence of contact between Keynes and his American counterparts and Keynes is believed to have developed his investing theories independently. Keynes did not teach his concepts in classes or seminars, unlike Graham and Dodd, and details of his investing theories became widely known only decades after his death in 1946. There was "considerable overlap" of Keynes's ideas with those of Graham and Dodd, though their ideas were not entirely congruent.

=== Benjamin Graham ===
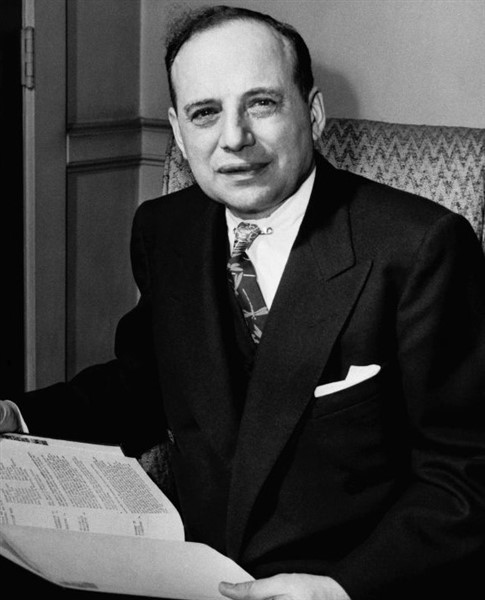
Benjamin Graham (pictured) established value investing along with fellow professor David Dodd.

Value investing was established by Benjamin Graham and David Dodd. Both were professors at Columbia Business School. In Graham's book The Intelligent Investor, he advocated the concept of margin of safety. The concept was introduced in the book Security Analysis which he co-authored with David Dodd in 1934 and calls for an approach to investing that is focused on purchasing equities at prices less than their intrinsic values. In terms of picking or screening stocks, he recommended purchasing firms which have steady profits, are trading at low prices to book value, have low price-to-earnings (P/E) ratios and which have relatively low debt.

=== Further evolution ===
The concept of value (as well as "book value") has evolved significantly since the 1970s. Book value is most useful in industries where most assets are tangible. Intangible assets such as patents, brands, or goodwill are difficult to quantify, and may not survive the break-up of a company. When an industry is going through fast technological advancements, the value of its assets is not easily estimated. Sometimes, the production power of an asset can be significantly reduced due to competitive disruptive innovation and therefore its value can suffer permanent impairment. One good example of decreasing asset value is a personal computer. An example of where book value does not mean much is the service and retail sectors. One modern model of calculating value is the discounted cash flow model (DCF), where the value of an asset is the sum of its future cash flows, discounted back to the present.

== Quantitative value investing ==
Quantitative value investing, also known as Systematic value investing, is a form of value investing that analyzes fundamental data such as financial statement line items, economic data, and unstructured data in a rigorous and systematic manner. Practitioners often employ quantitative applications such as statistical / empirical finance or mathematical finance, behavioral finance, natural language processing, and machine learning.

Quantitative investment analysis can trace its origin back to Security Analysis by Benjamin Graham and David Dodd in which the authors advocated detailed analysis of objective financial metrics of specific stocks. Quantitative investing replaces much of the ad-hoc financial analysis used by human fundamental investment analysts with a systematic framework designed and programmed by a person but largely executed by a computer in order to avoid cognitive biases that lead to inferior investment decisions. In an interview, Benjamin Graham admitted that even by that time ad-hoc detailed financial analysis of single stocks was unlikely to produce good risk-adjusted returns. Instead, he advocated a rules-based approach focused on constructing a coherent portfolio based on a relatively limited set of objective fundamental financial factors.

Joel Greenblatt's magic formula investing is a simple illustration of a quantitative value investing strategy. Many modern practitioners employ more sophisticated forms of quantitative analysis and evaluate numerous financial metrics, as opposed to just two as in the "magic formula". James O'Shaughnessy's What Works on Wall Street is a classic guide to quantitative value investing, containing backtesting performance data of various quantitative value strategies and value factors based on Compustat data from January 1927 until December 2009.

== Value investing performance ==
=== Performance of value strategies ===
Value investing has proven to be a successful investment strategy. There are several ways to evaluate the success. One way is to examine the performance of simple value strategies, such as buying low PE ratio stocks, low price-to-cash-flow ratio stocks, or low price-to-book ratio stocks. Numerous academics have published studies investigating the effects of buying value stocks. These studies have consistently found that value stocks outperform growth stocks and the market as a whole, not necessarily over short periods but when tracked over long periods, even going back to the 19th century. A review of 26 years of data (1990 to 2015) from US markets found that the over-performance of value investing was more pronounced in stocks for smaller and mid-size companies than for larger companies and recommended a "value tilt" with greater emphasis on value than growth investing in personal portfolios.

=== Performance of value investors ===
Since examining only the performance of the best known value investors introduces a selection bias (as typically investors might not become well known unless they are successful) a way to investigate the performance of a group of value investors was suggested by Warren Buffett in his 1984 speech The Superinvestors of Graham-and-Doddsville. In this speech, Buffett examined the performance of those investors who worked at Graham-Newman Corporation and were influenced by Benjamin Graham. Buffett's conclusion was that value investing is on average successful in the long run. This was also the conclusion of the academic research on simple value investing strategies.

From 1965 to 1990 there was little published research and articles in leading journals on value investing.

== Well-known value investors ==
=== The Graham-and-Dodd Disciples ===
==== Ben Graham's students ====
Benjamin Graham is regarded by many to be the father of value investing. Along with David Dodd, he wrote Security Analysis, first published in 1934. The most lasting contribution of this book to the field of security analysis was to emphasize the quantifiable aspects of security analysis (such as the evaluations of earnings and book value) while minimizing the importance of more qualitative factors such as the quality of a company's management. Graham later wrote The Intelligent Investor, a book that brought value investing to individual investors. Aside from Buffett, many of Graham's other students, such as William J. Ruane, Irving Kahn, Walter Schloss, and Charles Brandes went on to become successful investors in their own right.

Irving Kahn was one of Graham's teaching assistants at Columbia University in the 1930s. He was a close friend and confidant of Graham's for decades and made research contributions to Graham's texts Security Analysis, Storage and Stability, World Commodities and World Currencies and The Intelligent Investor. Kahn was a partner at various finance firms until 1978 when he and his sons, Thomas Graham Kahn and Alan Kahn, started the value investing firm, Kahn Brothers & Company. Irving Kahn remained chairman of the firm until his death at age 109.

Walter Schloss was another Graham-and-Dodd disciple. Schloss never had a formal education. When he was 18, he started working as a runner on Wall Street. He then attended investment courses taught by Ben Graham at the New York Stock Exchange Institute, and eventually worked for Graham in the Graham-Newman Partnership. In 1955, he left Graham’s company and set up his own investment firm, which he ran for nearly 50 years. Walter Schloss was one of the investors Warren Buffett profiled in his famous Superinvestors of Graham-and-Doddsville article.

Christopher H. Browne of Tweedy, Browne was well known for value investing. According to The Wall Street Journal, Tweedy, Browne was the favorite brokerage firm of Benjamin Graham during his lifetime; also, the Tweedy, Browne Value Fund and Global Value Fund have both beat market averages since their inception in 1993. In 2006, Christopher H. Browne wrote The Little Book of Value Investing in order to teach ordinary investors how to value invest.

Peter Cundill was a well-known Canadian value investor who followed the Graham teachings. His flagship Cundill Value Fund allowed Canadian investors access to fund management according to the strict principles of Graham and Dodd. Warren Buffett had indicated that Cundill had the credentials he's looking for in a chief investment officer.

==== Warren Buffett and Charlie Munger ====
Graham's most famous student is Warren Buffett, who ran successful investing partnerships before closing them in 1969 to focus on running Berkshire Hathaway. Buffett was a strong advocate of Graham's approach and strongly credits his success back to his teachings. Another disciple, Charlie Munger, who joined Buffett at Berkshire Hathaway in the 1970s and has since worked as Vice Chairman of the company, followed Graham's basic approach of buying assets below intrinsic value, but focused on companies with robust qualitative qualities, even if they weren't statistically cheap. This approach by Munger gradually influenced Buffett by reducing his emphasis on quantitatively cheap assets, and instead encouraged him to look for long-term sustainable competitive advantages in companies, even if they weren't quantitatively cheap relative to intrinsic value. Buffett is often quoted saying, "It's better to buy a great company at a fair price, than a fair company at a great price."

Buffett is a particularly skilled investor because of his temperament. He has a famous quote stating "be greedy when others are fearful, and fearful when others are greedy." In essence, he updated the teachings of Graham to fit a style of investing that prioritizes fundamentally good businesses over those that are deemed cheap by statistical measures. He is further known for a talk he gave titled the Super Investors of Graham and Doddsville. The talk was an outward appreciation for the fundamentals that Benjamin Graham instilled in him.

==== Michael Burry ====
Dr. Michael Burry, the founder of Scion Capital, is another strong proponent of value investing. Burry is famous for being the first investor to recognize and profit from the impending subprime mortgage crisis, as portrayed by Christian Bale in the movie The Big Short. Burry has said on multiple occasions that his investment style is built upon Benjamin Graham and David Dodd’s 1934 book Security Analysis: "All my stock picking is 100% based on the concept of a margin of safety."

==== Other Columbia Business School value investors ====
Columbia Business School has played a significant role in shaping the principles of the Value Investor, with professors and students making their mark on history and on each other. Ben Graham’s book, The Intelligent Investor, was Warren Buffett’s bible and he referred to it as "the greatest book on investing ever written.” A young Warren Buffett studied under Ben Graham, took his course and worked for his small investment firm, Graham Newman, from 1954 to 1956. Twenty years after Ben Graham, Roger Murray arrived and taught value investing to a young student named Mario Gabelli. About a decade or so later, Bruce Greenwald arrived and produced his own protégés, including Paul Sonkin—just as Ben Graham had Buffett as a protégé, and Roger Murray had Gabelli.

=== Mutual Series and Franklin Templeton disciples ===
Mutual Series has a reputation of producing top value managers and analysts in this modern era. This tradition stems from two individuals: Max Heine, founder of the well value investment firm Mutual Shares fund in 1949 and his protégé value investor Michael F. Price. Mutual Series was sold to Franklin Templeton Investments in 1996. Franklin Templeton Investments takes its name from Sir John Templeton, another contrarian value oriented investor.

Seth Klarman, a Mutual Series alum, is the founder and president of The Baupost Group, a Boston-based private investment partnership, and author of Margin of Safety, Risk Averse Investing Strategies for the Thoughtful Investor, which since has become a value investing classic. Now out of print, Margin of Safety has sold on Amazon for $1,200 and eBay for $2,000.

=== Other value investors ===
Laurence Tisch, who led Loews Corporation with his brother, Robert Tisch, for more than half a century, also embraced value investing. Shortly after his death in 2003 at age 80, Fortune wrote, "Larry Tisch was the ultimate value investor. He was a brilliant contrarian: He saw value where other investors didn't -- and he was usually right." By 2012, Loews Corporation, which continues to follow the principles of value investing, had revenues of $14.6 billion and assets of more than $75 billion.

Michael Larson is the Chief Investment Officer of Cascade Investment, which is the investment vehicle for the Bill & Melinda Gates Foundation and the Gates personal fortune. Cascade is a diversified investment shop established in 1994 by Gates and Larson. Larson graduated from Claremont McKenna College in 1980 and the Booth School of Business at the University of Chicago in 1981. Larson is a well known value investor but his specific investment and diversification strategies are not known. Larson has consistently outperformed the market since the establishment of Cascade and has rivaled or outperformed Berkshire Hathaway's returns as well as other funds based on the value investing strategy.

Martin J. Whitman is another well-regarded value investor. His approach is called safe-and-cheap, which was hitherto referred to as financial-integrity approach. Martin Whitman focuses on acquiring common shares of companies with extremely strong financial position at a price reflecting meaningful discount to the estimated NAV of the company concerned. Whitman believes it is ill-advised for investors to pay much attention to the trend of macro-factors (like employment, movement of interest rate, GDP, etc.) because they are not as important and attempts to predict their movement are almost always futile. Whitman's letters to shareholders of his Third Avenue Value Fund (TAVF) are considered valuable resources "for investors to pirate good ideas" by Joel Greenblatt in his book on special-situation investment You Can Be a Stock Market Genius.

Joel Greenblatt achieved annual returns at the hedge fund Gotham Capital of over 50% per year for 10 years from 1985 to 1995 before closing the fund and returning his investors' money. He is known for investing in special situations such as spin-offs, mergers, and divestitures.

Charles de Vaulx and Jean-Marie Eveillard are well known global value managers. For a time, these two were paired up at the First Eagle Funds, compiling an enviable track record of risk-adjusted outperformance. For example, Morningstar designated them the 2001 "International Stock Manager of the Year" and de Vaulx earned second place from Morningstar for 2006. Eveillard is known for his Bloomberg appearances where he insists that securities investors never use margin or leverage. The point made is that margin should be considered the anathema of value investing, since a negative price move could prematurely force a sale. In contrast, a value investor must be able and willing to be patient for the rest of the market to recognize and correct whatever pricing issue created the momentary value. Eveillard correctly labels the use of margin or leverage as speculation, the opposite of value investing.

Other notable value investors include Mason Hawkins, Thomas Forester, Whitney Tilson, Mohnish Pabrai, Li Lu, Vitaliy Katsenelson, Guy Spier and Tom Gayner, who manages the investment portfolio of Markel Insurance. San Francisco investing firm Dodge & Cox, founded in 1931 and one of the oldest US mutual funds still in existence as of 2019, emphasizes value investing.

== Criticism ==
Value stocks do not always beat growth stocks, as demonstrated in the late 1990s. Moreover, when value stocks perform well, it may not mean that the market is inefficient, though it may imply that value stocks are simply riskier and thus require greater returns. Furthermore, Foye and Mramor (2016) find that country-specific factors have a strong influence on measures of value (such as the book-to-market ratio). This leads them to conclude that the reasons why value stocks outperform are country-specific.

Also, one of the biggest criticisms of price centric value investing is that an emphasis on low prices (and recently depressed prices) regularly misleads retail investors; because fundamentally low (and recently depressed) prices often represent a fundamentally sound difference (or change) in a company's relative financial health. To that end, Warren Buffett has regularly emphasized that "it's far better to buy a wonderful company at a fair price, than to buy a fair company at a wonderful price."

In 2000, Stanford accounting professor Joseph Piotroski developed the F-score, which discriminates higher potential members within a class of value candidates. The F-score aims to discover additional value from signals in a firm's series of annual financial statements, after initial screening of static measures like book-to-market value. The F-score formula inputs financial statements and awards points for meeting predetermined criteria. Piotroski retrospectively analyzed a class of high book-to-market stocks in the period 1976–1996, and demonstrated that high F-score selections increased returns by 7.5% annually versus the class as a whole. The American Association of Individual Investors examined 56 screening methods in a retrospective analysis of the 2008 financial crisis, and found that only F-score produced positive results.

=== Over-simplification of value ===
The term "value investing" causes confusion because it suggests that it is a distinct strategy, as opposed to something that all investors (including growth investors) should do. In a 1992 letter to shareholders, Warren Buffett said, "In our opinion, the two approaches [value and growth] are joined at the hip: Growth is always a component in the calculation of value... we think the very term 'value investing' is redundant." In other words, there is no such thing as "non-value investing" because an investor putting their money into assets that they believe are overvalued would be better described as speculation, conspicuous consumption, etc., but not investing. Nevertheless, the term still exists, and therefore the quest for a distinct "value investing" strategy leads to over-simplification, both in practice and in theory.

Firstly, various naive "value investing" schemes, promoted as simple, are grossly inaccurate because they completely ignore the value of growth, or even of earnings altogether. For example, many investors look only at dividend yield. Thus they would prefer a 5% dividend yield at a declining company over a modestly higher-priced company that earns twice as much, reinvests half of earnings to achieve 20% growth, pays out the rest in the form of buybacks (which is more tax efficient), and has huge cash reserves. These "dividend investors" tend to hit older companies with huge payrolls that are already highly indebted and behind technologically, and can least afford to deteriorate further. By consistently voting for increased debt, dividends, etc., these naive "value investors" (and the type of management they tend to appoint) serve to slow innovation, and to prevent the majority of the population from working at healthy businesses.

Furthermore, the method of calculating the "intrinsic value" may not be well-defined. Some analysts believe that two investors can analyze the same information and reach different conclusions regarding the intrinsic value of the company, and that there is no systematic or standard way to value a stock. In other words, a value investing strategy can only be considered successful if it delivers excess returns after allowing for the risk involved, where risk may be defined in many different ways, including market risk, multi-factor models or idiosyncratic risk.

== See also ==
- Contrarian investing
- Index investing
- Low-volatility investing
- Quality investing
- Value (economics)
- Value averaging
- Value premium
