= Benjamin Graham =

American financial analyst, investor, and professor (1894–1976)

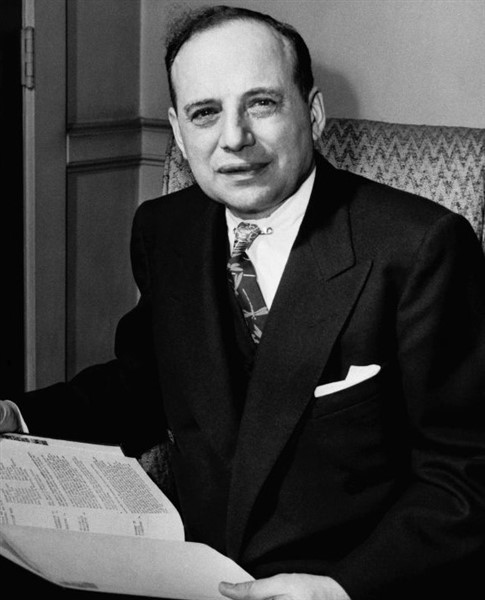
- Graham reading an edition of Moody's Manual, 1950
- Born: Benjamin Grossbaum; May 9, 1894; London, England, UK
- Died: September 21, 1976 (aged 82); Aix-en-Provence, France

Academic background
- Education: Columbia University (BA)

Academic work
- Institutions: Columbia University; University of California, Los Angeles
- Notable ideas: Security Analysis (1934); The Intelligent Investor (1949); Benjamin Graham formula

Benjamin Graham (/ɡræm/; né Grossbaum; May 9, 1894 – September 21, 1976) was an English-American financial analyst, economist, accountant, investor and professor. He is widely known as the "father of value investing", and wrote two of the discipline's founding texts: Security Analysis (1934) with David Dodd, and The Intelligent Investor (1949). His investment philosophy stressed independent thinking, emotional detachment, and careful security analysis, emphasizing the importance of distinguishing the price of a stock from the value of its underlying business.

After graduating from Columbia University at age 20, Graham started his career on Wall Street, eventually founding Graham–Newman Corp., a successful mutual fund. He also taught investing for many years at Columbia Business School, where one of his students was Warren Buffett. Graham later taught at the Anderson School of Management at the University of California, Los Angeles.

Graham laid the groundwork for value investing at mutual funds, hedge funds, diversified holding companies, and other investment vehicles. He was the driving force behind the establishment of the profession of security analysis and the Chartered Financial Analyst designation. He also advocated the creation of index funds decades before they were introduced. Throughout his career, Graham had many notable disciples who went on to earn substantial success as investors, including Irving Kahn and Warren Buffett, who described Graham as the second most influential person in his life after his own father. Among other well-known investors influenced by Graham were Charles D. Ellis, Mario Gabelli, Seth Klarman, Howard Marks, John Neff and Sir John Templeton.

== Early life and education ==
Graham was born Benjamin Grossbaum on May 9, 1894, in London to English parents. On his mother's side of Jewish origin, he was the great-grandson of Rabbi Yaakov Gesundheit and a cousin of neuroscientist Ralph Waldo Gerard. He moved with his family to New York City when he was one year old. The family changed his name from Grossbaum to Graham to assimilate into American society and avoid anti judaic sentiments.

After the death of his father, who owned a successful porcelain shop, and the Panic of 1907, the family fell into poverty. That experience helped shape Graham's lifelong quest for investment values. Graham excelled as a student, graduating as salutatorian of his class at Columbia, finishing his studies in three-and-a-half years after entering at age 16. Before the end of his senior year, the college offered him teaching positions in three different departments: mathematics, English, and philosophy.

During, and for several years after, World War I, Graham began writing for The Magazine of Wall Street, the largest financial publication in the world at the time. Therein, Graham showcased his emerging thoughts and methods on value investing, such as his method of calculating goodwill. His work so impressed the owner and editor, Richard Wyckoff, that Graham was offered a regular column, which Graham accepted, and a job. Later, Wyckoff tried to convince Graham to become editor for the magazine, offering an attractive salary that Graham's regular employer managed to successfully counteroffer.

Graham chose instead to help support his widowed mother by taking a job on Wall Street, where he later ran private partnerships and, starting in 1936, the Graham-Newman fund, together with Jerome Newman. Early on, Graham made a name for himself with "The Northern Pipeline Affair", an early case of shareholder activism involving John D. Rockefeller. Graham's research indicated Northern Pipeline Co. held vast cash and bond assets that he believed were not being put to good use and bought enough shares to force a proxy vote to distribute these assets to shareholders.

Later, Graham patented two innovative hand-held calculators, wrote a Broadway play called "Baby Pompadour," and taught himself Spanish so he could translate a major Uruguayan novel, Mario Benedetti’s The Truce, into English. (By the end of his life, Graham knew at least seven languages.)

== Investment and academic career ==
His first book Security Analysis, which he co-authored with David Dodd, was published in 1934. In Security Analysis, he proposed a clear definition of investment that was distinguished from what he deemed speculation. It read, "An investment operation is one which, upon thorough analysis, promises safety of principal and a satisfactory return. Operations not meeting these requirements are speculative."

Warren Buffett describes The Intelligent Investor (1949) as "the best book about investing ever written." Graham exhorted the stock market participant to first draw a fundamental distinction between investment and speculation.

An early copy of Graham's Intelligent Investor

Graham wrote that the owner of stocks should regard them first and foremost as conferring part ownership in a business. With that perspective in mind, the stock owner should be unconcerned with erratic fluctuations in stock prices, since in the short term the stock market behaves like a voting machine, but in the long term it acts like a weighing machine (i.e. its true value will be reflected in its stock price in the long run).

Graham distinguished between defensive and enterprising investors. The defensive investor seeks to minimize the time and effort—and, above all, the worry—of investing. So the defensive investor seldom trades, renouncing the attempt to forecast market behavior and security prices, instead holding for the long term. The enterprising investor, in contrast, is one who has more time, interest, and can devote the effort to original analysis seeking exceptional buys in the market. Graham recommended that enterprising investors devote substantial time and effort to analyze the financial state of companies. When a company is available at a discount to its intrinsic value, a "margin of safety" exists, which makes it suitable for investment.

Graham wrote that "investment is most intelligent when it is most businesslike." By that he meant that investing, like running a business, is a systematic effort to maximize the likelihood of earning a reasonable return and to minimize the probability of suffering a severe loss. Thinking for yourself is vital: "You are neither right nor wrong because the crowd disagrees with you," Graham wrote. "You are right because your data and reasoning are right."

Graham's favorite metaphor is that of Mr. Market, a fellow who turns up every day at the investor's door offering to buy or sell his shares at a different price. Usually, the price quoted by Mr. Market seems plausible, but occasionally it is ridiculous. The investor is free either to agree with his quoted price and trade with him, or to ignore him completely. Mr. Market doesn't mind this, and will be back the following day to quote another price. The investor should not regard the whims of Mr. Market as determining the value of the shares that the investor owns. The investor should profit from market folly rather than participate in it. The investor is best off concentrating on how the underlying businesses perform, not on how Mr. Market behaves.

Graham was critical of the corporations of his day for obfuscated and irregular financial reporting that made it difficult for investors to discern the true state of the business's finances. He was an advocate of dividend payments to shareholders rather than businesses hoarding all of their profits as retained earnings. He also criticized those who advised that some types of stocks were a good buy at any price, because of the prospect of potentially unlimited earnings growth, without a thorough analysis of the business's actual financial condition. These observations remain relevant today.

Graham's investment performance was approximately a ~20% annualized return over 1936 to 1956. The overall market performance for the same time period was 12.2% annually on average. Even so, both Buffett and Berkshire Hathaway vice chairman Charlie Munger have said they consider Graham's methods necessary but not sufficient for success in contemporary investing, because Graham placed too little emphasis on the potential for future growth. As Buffett told journalist Carol Loomis in 1988 for Fortune, "Boy, if I had listened only to Ben [and not also to Charlie Munger], would I ever be a lot poorer."

Graham's largest gain was from GEICO, in which the firm Graham-Newman purchased a 50% interest in 1948 for $712,500. To comply with a regulatory limitation, Graham-Newman was ordered by the U.S. Securities and Exchange Commission to distribute its GEICO stock to the fund's investors. An investor who owned 100 shares of the Graham-Newman fund in 1948 (worth $11,413) and who held on to the GEICO distribution would have had $1.66 million by 1972. Graham-Newman Corp. closed in 1956 when Graham retired from active investing. GEICO was eventually acquired in whole by Berkshire Hathaway in 1996, having previously been saved by Buffett and John J. Byrne in 1976.

== Personal life ==
Graham married three times and had four children.

On September 21, 1976, Graham died in Aix-en-Provence, in southern France, at the age of 82.

== Legacy ==
His contributions spanned numerous fields, primarily fundamental value investing.

Graham is considered the "father of value investing." His two books, Security Analysis and The Intelligent Investor, defined his investment philosophy, especially what it means to be a value investor. His most famous student is Warren Buffett, who is consistently ranked among the wealthiest persons in the world. According to Buffett, Graham used to say that he wished every day to do something foolish, something creative, and something generous. And Buffett noted, Graham excelled most at the last.

While many value investors have been influenced by Graham, his most notable investing disciples include Charles Brandes, William J. Ruane, Irving Kahn, and Walter J. Schloss. In addition, Graham's thoughts on investing have influenced hedge-fund managers Bill Ackman, Seth Klarman, Whitney Tilson, and Nancy Zimmerman. While some of Graham's investing concepts are now regarded as superseded or outdated, most are still recognized as important, and Security Analysis or The Intelligent Investor are required reading for new hires at many investment firms around the world.

Graham also made contributions to economic theory. Most notably, he proposed a new basis for both U.S. and global currency as an alternative to the gold standard. Graham regarded this currency theory as his most important professional work; it gained renewed attention decades after his death in the aftermath of the 2008 financial crisis.

== Bibliography ==
=== Books ===
- Security Analysis, editions 1934, 1940, 1951, 1962, 1988, 2008 and 2023. ISBN 978-1264932405
- The Intelligent Investor, editions 1949, reprinted in 2005; 1959, 1965, 1973 with many reprints since
- Storage and Stability: A Modern Ever-normal Granary. New York: McGraw Hill. 1937. ISBN 0-07-024774-9 – via Internet Archive.
- The Interpretation of Financial Statements, 1937, 2nd Edition
- World Commodities and World Currency. New York & London: McGraw-Hill Book Company. 1944. ISBN 0-07-024806-0 – via Internet Archive.
- Benjamin Graham, The Memoirs of the Dean of Wall Street (1996) ISBN 978-0-07-024269-2

=== Papers ===
- Graham, Benjamin; Graham, Benjamin (1917). "Some Calculus Suggestions by a Student". The American Mathematical Monthly. 24 (6): 265–271. doi:10.2307/2973181. JSTOR 2973181.
- Graham, Benjamin (1943). "The Critique of Commodity-Reserve Currency: A Point-by-Point Reply". The Journal of Political Economy. 51 (1): 66–69. doi:10.1086/255988. JSTOR 1826594. S2CID 154929745.
- Graham, Benjamin; Graham, Benjamin (1946). "The Undistributed Profits Tax and The Investor". The Yale Law Journal. 46 (1): 1–18. doi:10.2307/791630. JSTOR 791630.
- Graham, Benjamin (1947). "Money as Pure Commodity". American Economic Review. 37 (2): 304–307. JSTOR 1821137.
- Graham, Benjamin (1947). "National Productivity: Its Relationship to Unemployment-in-Prosperity". American Economic Review. 37 (2): 384–396. JSTOR 1821149.
- Graham, Benjamin; Graham, Benjamin (1962). "Some Investment Aspects of Accumulation Through Equities". The Journal of Finance. 17 (2): 203–214. doi:10.2307/2977419. JSTOR 2977419.
- Graham, Benjamin (1962). "The Commodity-Reserve Currency Proposal Reconsidered". In Yeager, Leland B. (ed.). In Search of Monetary Constitution. Cambridge, MA: Harvard University Press. pp. 184–214.
- "Securities in an Insecure World," speech by Benjamin Graham, 15 November 1963

== See also ==
- Warren Buffett & Charlie Munger, two investors notable for their adherence to value investing
- Benjamin Graham formula
- Valuation using discounted cash flows
- Gordon model
