= One Up on Wall Street =

1989 book by Peter Lynch and John Rothchild

- Cover of the 2000 Simon & Schuster edition
- Author: Peter Lynch with John Rothchild
- Language: English
- Subject: Investing
- Genre: Non-fiction
- Publisher: Simon & Schuster
- Publication date: 1989
- Pages: 304
- ISBN: 978-0-7432-0040-0

One Up on Wall Street: How to Use What You Already Know to Make Money in the Market is a 1989 book written by American investor and mutual fund manager Peter Lynch, co-authored with John Rothchild. It outlines Lynch's investment method during his time managing Fidelity Magellan Fund at Fidelity Investments. The book explains Lynch's approach to stock investing and teaches how individual investors to identify good investments in their everyday lives before those stocks are widely recognized by Wall Street investors.

The book was on the New York Times bestseller and has sold over one million copies.

== Summary ==
The book's core idea is that retail investors have an advantage over professionals given that they learn about new companies and products before Wall Street finds them. This gives individual investor what Lynch refers to as their "edge." He advises individual investors to find what he refers to as "tenbaggers" before institutional investors drive up the stock price.

However, besides encouraging individuals to find winning companies, Lynch emphasizes that investors conduct fundamental analysis by reviewing the companies' financial statements. The book emphasizes focusing on company fundamentals, such as earnings growth and valuation, rather than macroeconomic factors.

Lynch divides stocks into six categories:

- Slow growers: Mature companies with slow growth. They often pay dividends.
- Stalwarts: Large-cap companies that are faster than slow growers much slower than fast growers.
- Fast growers: Smaller companies with high earnings potential. These are Lynch's favorite companies
- Cyclicals: Companies whose earnings rise and fall based on the economy.
- Turnarounds: Companies recovering from financial distress.
- Asset plays: Companies that have valuable assets that are undervalued by the market.

== Reception ==
One Up on Wall Street has received generally positive reviews from critics. It became a New York Times bestseller and has been widely recommended as an introductory book on stock investing.

Some critics have pointed out that while the examples in the book are dated, the principles remain true.

== See also ==
- Value Investing
- Peter Lynch
- Gerald Tsai
- Warren Buffett
- William Danoff
- Stock selection criterion
- Beating the Street
