= Beating the Street =

- Author: Peter Lynch and John Rothchild
- Language: English
- Subject: Investing
- Publisher: Simon & Schuster
- Publication date: 1993
- Media type: Print
- Pages: 320
- ISBN: 978-0-671-75915-5

Beating the Street is a 1993 investment book written by Peter Lynch and co-authored with John Rothchild. It is considered a follow-up to Lynch's 1989 book, One Up on Wall Street. The book expands on his investment philosophy with detailed case studies from his tenure managing the Fidelity Magellan Fund. It teaches retail investors how to select stocks and build their portfolios using their everyday knowledge.

Similar to his earlier work, Lynch makes the case that disciplined individual investors can outperform professional fund managers.

== Content ==
Beating the Street describes Lynch's approach to picking winning stocks through a combination of real-world knowledge and conducting funadmental analysis. He reiterates the importance of "investing in what you know" while providing more tools for building portfolios.

The book is structured around Lynch's management of the Magellan Fund, where he provides examples of successful and unsuccessful investments to illustrate his principles.

Lynch reiterate several core principles:

- Invest in what you understand: Investors should only focus on companies they are familiar with or can understand.
- Do your own research: Base decisions on independent research not on the market or macroeconomic conditions.
- Look for growth at a reasonable price: Focus on companies with high earnings potentials that are undervalued.
- Long-term perspective: Successful investing requires patience and discipline.

== Reception ==
The book is often praised by professionals for its practical advice. It is known for demystifying investing for non-professionals.

It maintains a high average rating on reader platforms and is frequently recommended in investment literature.

== See also ==
- One Up on Wall Street
- Peter Lynch
- Warren Buffett
- Phil Town
- William Danoff
- Value investing
- Stock valuation
