= Learn to Earn =

1996 book by Peter Lynch and John Rothchild

- Author: Peter Lynch and John Rothchild
- Subject: Investing, business, stock market
- Genre: Non-fiction
- Publisher: Fireside
- Publication date: 1996
- ISBN: 978-0-684-81163-5

Learn to Earn: A Beginner's Guide to the Basics of Investing and Business is a 1996 non-fiction book written by American investor Peter Lynch and finance writer John Rothchild. The book, intended mainly for beginning investors and high school graduates, is an introduction to investing, business, capitalism, and the stock market. This is one of Lynch's less technical books.

== Summary ==
The book begins by giving an overview of capitalism. Lynch discusses concepts such as Adam Smith's "invisible hand," free enterprise, and the role of investors in economic growth.

Later sections focus on more practical investing methods. Lynch goes on to explain how to read stock tables, company annual reports, and evaluate the role of public companies in the economy.

The book discussed how individual investors can find good opportunities in companies they already know. Some ordinary companies mentioned in the book include McDonald's, Pepsi, and Nike. The authors encourage shifting from a consumption-oriented mindset to one of ownership.

Lynch and Rothchild also argue that real-life financial skills such as investing are not sufficiently taught in schools.

== Reception ==
Lean to Earn was cited in a 1996 Los Angeles Times article on individual stock investing, summarizing Lynch's argument that a diversified portfolio of 10 to 15 stocks could build wealth over time if it included a few major long-term winners.

The book appeared on The New York Times best-seller lists.

== See also ==
- One Up on Wall Street
- Beating the Street
- Stock market
- Value investing
