= Kristin Loberg =

American author and ghostwriter

- Education: Cornell University
- Occupations: Author and ghostwriter
- Years active: 2006-2023
- Website: kristinloberg.com

Kristin Loberg is an American author and ghostwriter. She is known for ghostwriting books written by Sanjay Gupta, David Perlmutter, David Agus, and Phil Town. In 2023, it was discovered that many books authored by Loberg contained plagiarized material.

== Early life and education ==
Kristin Loberg grew up in Westwood, Los Angeles. She graduated from Marymount High School before attending Cornell University where she studied biology and chemistry, and majored in Romance Languages. After failing to be accepted into medical school in 1997, she decided to become a writer.

== Career ==
Loberg originally tried authoring medical thrillers, but her first two novels were unpublished. Afterwards, she began ghostwriting medical books aimed at general audiences. She became known for ghostwriting books authored by celebrities. Publishers commonly introduced to her prospective authors and recommended her ghostwriting services. Between 2006 and 2022, Loberg wrote over 45 books published by the Big Five publishers in the United States. Most of these books were on the topic of health, diets and wellness. She co-authored titles with several notable authors, including neurosurgeon Sanjay Gupta, celebrity doctor David Perlmutter, oncologist David Agus, and investor Phil Town.

In 2023, a reporter for the Los Angeles Times found 95 instances of plagiarism in an upcoming book ghostwritten by Loberg, The Book of Animal Secrets: Nature’s Lessons for a Long and Happy Life by David Agus. This plagiarism was identified by using IThenticate plagiarism detection software, which Loberg herself had recommended in a 2014 blog post for the Los Angeles Editors and Writers Group. The book's publication was delayed so that the plagiarized material could be removed.

In the following months, sections from other books ghostwritten by Loberg were discovered to contain substantial plagiarism. Publishers Simon & Schuster, Penguin Random House and HarperCollins told the LA Times that they were reviewing previous books by Loberg for plagiarism. By 2023, Hachette Book Group and Simon & Schuster had released new versions of some of these books, with the plagiarized material removed and all references to Loberg deleted.

Loberg issued a public apology for the plagiarism on her personal website, and deleted all other content from the website.

== See also ==
- Plagiarism from Wikipedia
