= WeSeed =

Investment education website

- Company type: Stock Market 101— A Free Educational Site
- Dissolved: 2013
- Headquarters: Chicago, IL, United States
- Area served: The world
- Founders: Matt Hulsizer and Jenny Just
- Industry: Finance
- Website: http://www.weseed.com
- Current status: Closed

WeSeed.com was a free website aimed at teaching people about the stock market. It allows visitors to virtually invest in real stocks and also serves as a social network, allowing people to interact and discuss their opinions on different stocks and markets. The site uses a proprietary WeSearch engine, which allows users to search for the things that interest them. The search then returns stocks that might appeal to those interests. WeSeed officially closed on August 31, 2013, but continues to offer the free education market lessons. In an email sent to all WeSeed users, the company said that they are exploring ways to restart the website.

== Philosophy ==
Founded on the Peter Lynch premise “invest in what you know,” the site encourages people to share their knowledge about the companies and products they use in their everyday lives. Users can read expert blogs, play games, watch videos, and leave comments about their favorite products and companies. Commentary includes news, customer experiences, and consumer trends that affect the company's viability.

== Reviews ==
WeSeed was selected to be one of 24 presenters at the 2008 Finovate—a showcase of the best finance and banking startups. Shortly after Finovate, Mashable reviewed the site. PC Magazine gave WeSeed a 3.5 out of 5 rating. Thrillist.com also reviewed it, noting that the site breaks down the mystery of the stock market for the "market-unsavvy."

== Awards ==
WeSeed's iPhone application received the “Staff Pick” award by Apple. Released on November 14, 2008, the application allows people to access WeSeed on their iPhone.
