= Personal narrative =

Story about the narrator's own experience

A personal narrative is a story about the narrator's own experiences, usually told in the first person. Personal narratives can concern a single incident or a significant part of a person's life. In the study of oral storytelling, researchers examine both the events described and the way a narrator presents them to an audience.

Personal narratives are a means of interpreting experience, expressing personal identity, and developing relationships. Their form and meaning depend partly on the setting in which they are told and the relationship between the storyteller and listeners. Researchers study them as texts, performances, conversational interactions, and social practices.

== Personal narratives and life stories ==
A personal narrative may recount an everyday event or a major turning point. Linda Dégh identifies family life, work, celebrations, illness, religion, and travel among the experiences that can become material for storytelling.

A life story connects accounts of experience across a person's life. Charlotte Linde uses the term for stories and related explanations that make a point about the speaker and remain worth telling over time. In this sense, a life story is assembled and retold in different conversations, rather than delivered as a single, complete account. Linde distinguishes this conversational form from autobiography, a written literary genre.

Linde identifies causality and continuity as principles through which people make their life stories coherent. Causality concerns the connections between events and the reasons given for them; continuity concerns how a person represents connections across time.

== Functions ==
=== Identity and interpretation ===
Personal narratives allow people to select, connect, and interpret experiences. Linde treats storytelling as a resource for developing a sense of self and communicating that self to others. Narrators may revise an account as their values, relationships, or understanding of the past change.

Stories can also convey judgments about conduct. In Linde's analysis, a narrator may present an action as reasonable, justify a decision, or describe a mistake as a lesson learned. Such accounts invite listeners to assess both the events and the person telling them. Erving Goffman discusses how accounts of experience can seek sympathy, approval, understanding, or amusement. Even self-deprecating stories can distinguish the narrator's present perspective from the earlier self whose actions are being described.

Elinor Ochs and Lisa Capps examine the relationship between memory and everyday storytelling. Narrators interpret remembered events while constructing accounts that others can understand and find credible. Stanton Wortham similarly argues that telling a story can help constitute a person's identity, as well as describe it.

=== Relationships and social context ===
Sharing personal stories can communicate trust and develop intimacy. As relationships become closer, people may expect to hear about significant events in one another's lives. The stories selected, the details included, and the explanations offered can therefore vary with the audience.

The relationship between storytelling and identity is also culturally situated. Linde cautions that her account of the self concerns a particular cultural setting. Her discussion of feminist criticism questions theories that treat one model of individual identity as universal while overlooking women's experiences and those of marginalized groups.

The circumstances in which a story is collected also matter. In an ethnographic interview, for example, the researcher's questions help shape the resulting account. A life history produced in this setting reflects the interaction between researcher and narrator.

== Approaches to analysis ==
Kristin Langellier distinguishes approaches that examine personal narratives as story texts, storytelling performances, conversational interactions, social processes, and political practices. These approaches emphasize different aspects of a narrative: its language and structure, its delivery, the participation of listeners, or its wider social setting.

=== Narrative structure ===
William Labov and Joshua Waletzky developed an influential approach to the analysis of oral narratives of personal experience. Their work examines how clauses represent a sequence of events and how narrators communicate the significance of those events.

The Labovian model distinguishes six elements:

Element	Function
Abstract	Briefly summarizes what the story is about.
Orientation	Introduces the people, time, place, and circumstances.
Complicating action	Recounts the events that move the story forward.
Evaluation	Communicates why the events matter or are worth telling, and the narrator's attitude toward them.
Resolution	Gives the outcome of the events.
Coda	Marks the end of the story and returns attention to the present conversation.

These elements provide an analytical framework rather than a required template for every story. An abstract or coda may be absent, and evaluation can be expressed within the telling rather than confined to a separate concluding statement.

==== Limitations ====
Anna De Fina and Alexandra Georgakopoulou discuss difficulties in assigning narrative clauses to fixed categories. Reported speech, for example, may advance the action while also conveying an evaluation. Stories told collaboratively or in fragments may not fit a model developed around extended accounts by individual speakers.

A further limitation concerns interaction: a model focused on the narrator's sequence of clauses may give insufficient attention to listeners' questions, responses, and contributions. De Fina and Georgakopoulou also discuss reportability, or what makes an event worth telling in a particular setting, and credibility, or what makes an account believable to its audience.

=== Storytelling as performance ===
The performance approach examines how a story is told in a particular social situation. Richard Bauman describes performance as communication presented for an audience's attention and evaluation. Analysis therefore considers the storyteller's delivery and relationship with listeners, as well as the words of the story.

Storytellers use signals to frame an account and indicate how it should be understood. These signals can establish the kind of telling being offered and invite the audience to interpret it accordingly. Bauman calls this process keying. The audience's expectations and responses help shape the performance.

A teller may also qualify their authority or ability to recount a story. Bauman's work on the negotiation of performance examines how such qualifications affect the relationship between storyteller and audience.

=== Conversational interaction ===
A conversational approach studies how stories emerge within ongoing talk. It examines how speakers obtain an opportunity to tell a story, how listeners participate, and how the conversation resumes afterward.

Harvey Sacks's analysis of joke-telling distinguishes a preface, a telling, and a response sequence. The preface proposes or prepares for the telling; the telling presents the story; and the response shows how the audience receives it. Although Sacks's example concerns jokes, it illustrates how a storytelling event depends on the organization of conversation, including opportunities to speak and expectations about the audience's response.
