= Edward Johnson III =

American businessman (1930–2022)

- Born: Edward Crosby Johnson III; June 29, 1930; Milton, Massachusetts, U.S.
- Died: March 23, 2022 (aged 91); Wellington, Florida, U.S.
- Education: Harvard College
- Occupations: Chairman Emeritus, Fidelity Investments
- Spouse: Elizabeth B. "Lillie" Johnson
- Children: 3; including Abigail
- Father: Edward C. Johnson II

Edward Crosby "Ned" Johnson III (June 29, 1930 – March 23, 2022) was an American businessman. In 2019, his net worth was estimated at US$8.2 billion.

== Early life ==
Johnson was born in Milton, Massachusetts, the son of Elsie Livingston Johnson and Edward C. Johnson II. He attended prep school at Milton Academy before transferring to Tabor Academy, and graduated with a bachelor of arts and sciences degree from Harvard College in 1954.

== Career ==
Following service in the United States Army, Johnson became a research analyst at Fidelity Investments in 1957, the company founded by his father in 1949. He later became the portfolio manager for the Fidelity Trend Fund in 1960, and ran the famous Fidelity Magellan Fund from 1963 to 1977. He then became president of the company in 1972, and chairman and CEO in 1977.

Johnson was the first to begin the practice of permitting check writing on money market funds. He was also the first to sell discount brokerage services to banks, insurance companies, and consumers. He supported and invested in automation of brokerage sales and operations.

In a November 2016, memo to Fidelity employees, Johnson announced he would retire in December and turn over the chairmanship to his daughter Abigail. Although he would no longer be a member of the board of directors, Johnson planned to "maintain office hours ... and continue to consult periodically with Abby."

== Society memberships, awards, and honors ==
Johnson was a fellow of the American Academy of Arts and Sciences, a trustee of the Beth Israel Hospital and the Boston Museum of Fine Arts and a member of the Boston Society of Security Analysts.

He has been given honorary doctorates by Boston University, Bentley College and the Hobart and William Smith Colleges. He was an honorary fellow of London Business School.

== Wealth and philanthropy ==
Ned Johnson III was a descendent of loyalist merchant and slaveholder Robert Gilbert Livingston (1712–1789) and Catharina Johnson McPheadres Livingston. Livingston had over a hundred thousand acres in New York on the Hudson River Valley, Brooklyn, Long Island and Harlem. By royal charter of George I of Great Britain in 1686, Robert "The Elder" Livingston (1654–1728) was granted a patent to 160,000 acres along the Hudson River.

With an estimated current net worth of around $8.4 billion, he was ranked by Forbes as the 57th richest person in America.

In 1965, the US–based Fidelity Foundation was founded by Edward C. Johnson III and his father. The Edward C. Johnson Fund, a $334 million charitable fund, contributes to institutions in the Boston area and beyond.

== Personal life ==
His wife was Elizabeth B. "Lillie" Johnson, a trustee of the Museum of Fine Arts and Winterthur Museum. They resided in Boston.

His daughter Abigail Johnson took over the role of CEO of Fidelity Investments and chairman of Fidelity International in 2014. As of 2012, Abigail owned up to 24% of the shares in Fidelity, had a net worth of $10.3 billion and was ranked 29th on the Forbes 400 list of richest Americans.

His other daughter is Elizabeth L. Johnson. In 2012, it was estimated that Elizabeth had a net worth of roughly $2.5 billion.

His son, Edward Johnson IV, is president of family-owned Pembroke Real Estate. The firm manages 6.5 million square feet of office and residential real estate, including the Boston Seaport. In 2012, Edward's net worth was estimated at $2.5 billion.

On March 23, 2022, Johnson died "peacefully at his home in Florida surrounded by much of his family," according to his daughter Abby Johnson.
