= Robert Stansky =

Robert 'Bob' Edward Stansky is an American portfolio manager who served as manager of the Magellan Fund from June 1996 to October 2005, before that he managed the Fidelity Growth Company Fund since 1987. He joined Fidelity Investments in 1983 starting as a research analyst. In 1984 and '85 he was put in charge of the Fidelity Select Defense and Aerospace Portfolio.

He earned a BA from Nichols College in 1978 and an MBA from New York University in 1983.
