= Education in personalized medicine =

Personalized medicine involves medical treatments based on the characteristics of individual patients, including their medical history, family history, and genetics. Although personal genetic information is becoming increasingly important in healthcare, there is a lack of sufficient education in medical genetics among physicians and the general public. For example, pharmacogenomics (genetic factors influencing drug response) is practiced worldwide by only a limited number of pharmacists, although most pharmacy colleges in the United States now include it in their curriculum. It is also increasingly common for genetic testing to be offered directly to consumers, who subsequently seek out educational materials and bring their results to their doctors. Issues involving genetic testing also invariably lead to ethical and legal concerns, such as the potential for inadvertent effects on family members, increased insurance rates, or increased psychological stress.

== Training ==
As of 2009, the primary of the care physicians did not have adequate training in genetics or genomics. Although medical school curricula typically include medical genetics, fewer than half offer a standalone course, and the emphasis on practical applications is weak.

In the United States, Stanford University was the first medical school in the United States to offer a course teaching the interpretation of genetic data. Students were able to study their own genotypes, determined using commercially available genotyping platforms (23andMe or Navigenics). Although there was skepticism that this would improve educational outcomes, a survey later showed that this had increased students' enthusiasm for the subject. A similar class is offered at Mount Sinai School of Medicine, launched in 2012, in which students have the option of analyzing their entire genome sequence instead of only their genotype.

== Personal genotyping and education ==
In 2010, the University of California, Berkeley offered entering students a genetic test for SNPs affecting alcohol, lactose, and folate metabolism. The goal was "to spark discussion during orientation on how genetic testing works, the results of the students' tests and their decisions on whether or not to participate." However, criticism of the program led to an informational hearing by the California State Committee on Higher Education, and a bill was introduced by Chris Norby to prevent California state universities from genetically testing their students. The California Department of Public Health concluded that the program constituted clinical testing, and the university released only aggregate information instead of personal results.

As described in the preceding section, in some courses on personalized medicine, students have been able to study their personal genetic information. For the Stanford course, which was designed for graduate and medical students, a review was conducted in 2009-2010 by a "joint genotyping task force" including research and clinical faculty, biomedical ethicists, genetic counselors, and legal counsel. The recommendations adopted included: making genetic testing optional (with instructors blinded to the choice of the students), strict data confidentiality (only aggregate data was made available during discussions), incorporation of lectures discussing issues related to personal genotyping, and availability of genetic counseling to students if necessary.

== See also ==
- Medical education
- Genetic testing
