= David Perlmutter =

American celebrity doctor (born 1954)

- Born: December 31, 1954 (age 71)
- Education: Lafayette College, University of Miami School of Medicine
- Known for: Grain Brain
- Scientific career
- Fields: Medicine, Neurology, Neurogastroenterology
- Website: www.drperlmutter.com

David Perlmutter (born December 31, 1954) is an American celebrity doctor, author, low-carbohydrate diet advocate and promoter of functional medicine.

Perlmutter has been widely criticized by dietitians and physicians for promoting misinformation about gluten-containing grains including whole grains which he argues are a main cause of many diseases including brain disorders.

== Early life and education ==
Perlmutter's father Irwin was a neurosurgeon in Miami. David Perlmutter received a Doctor of Medicine degree from the University of Miami School of Medicine. He is also a fellow of the American College of Nutrition.

== Career ==
Perlmutter wrote the book Grain Brain, released in September 2013, promoting the concept that gluten causes neurological conditions, which was on the New York Times bestseller list for several weeks. The book was cowritten with Kristin Loberg, a ghostwriter known for working with other celebrity doctors such as Sanjay Gupta and David Agus. In 2023 it was discovered that Grain Brain contained passages plagiarized from Agus' 2012 The End of Illness, which was also cowritten by Loberg.

In 2022, Perlmutter published Drop Acid, which advocates for a theory that excess levels of uric acid has negative physiological and neurological health consequences.

== Reception ==
Perlmutter and his books have faced criticism from other physicians and commentators. His endorsement of gluten-free and paleolithic diets has been criticized by physicians and is not supported by anthropological research on the Pleistocene human diet. For example, Nash and Slutzky (2014) have written that "according to Grain Brain, much chronic disease originates in the widespread ingestion of carbohydrates, and these foodstuff, rather than cholesterol or saturated fats, are the premier contributor to an unhealthy individual. Numerous recent studies, however, have provided high-level evidence to the contrary."

Epidemiologist David Katz, founding director of the Yale-Griffin Prevention Research Center at Griffin Hospital in Derby, CT, has criticized Grain Brain, calling it a "silly book" and saying that "Perlmutter is way ahead of any justifiable conclusion". Perlmutter's opinion that hormonal birth control has long term negative effects on women has also been criticized by medical experts.

Microbiome expert Jonathan Eisen criticized Brain Maker in blunt terms. "To think we can magically heal diseases by changing to a gluten-free diet and taking some probiotics is idiotic... It resembles more the presentation of a snake-oil salesman than that of a person interested in actually figuring out how to help people."

Perlmutter's advice to parents that they should ask their pediatricians about scheduling childhood vaccinations separately is contrary to advice from the CDC and the American Academy of Pediatrics.

A review of Grain Brain by The Health Sciences Academy quotes Perlmutter as saying even whole grains, are "a terrorist group that bullies our most precious organ, the brain" but noted the health data on whole grain consumption is associated with a reduced risk of many chronic diseases. The review concluded that "Perlmutter based his book primarily on belief, selectively citing studies and not including the full body of scientific evidence".

A 2020 paper in Palgrave Communications stated that Perlmutter "has received severe criticism from scientists about his claims that Alzheimer’s disease, depression, Parkinson’s disease, and attention deficit hyperactivity disorder (ADHD) can be prevented by avoiding grains, or that the link between autism and vaccines is “ill-defined”".

Perlmutter is listed by Quackwatch as a promoter of questionable health products.

== Personal life ==
Perlmutter is the father of artist Reisha Perlmutter.and Dr. Austin Perlmutter.
