= Sascha Rothchild =

American writer (born 1976)

- Born: November 15, 1976 (age 49)
- Education: Boston College
- Occupation: Writer
- Parent(s): John Rothchild; Susan Berns
- Website: www.sascharothchild.com

Sascha Rothchild (born November 15, 1976) is an American writer.

== Life ==
Rothchild grew up in Miami Beach, Florida and is one of three siblings. Her father, John Rothchild, is a well-known non-fiction writer and her mother, Susan Rothchild, is the daughter of 21 Club founder Charlie Berns.

She attended Boston College and graduated with honors in 1998. She then moved to Los Angeles and began her writing career. She lives in Los Angeles with her husband and two boxer dogs.

== Career ==
Rothchild was featured reading from her teen diary at the stage show, Mortified, on This American Life, My Experimental Phase episode. Her segment "Miami Vices" is on the This American Life best of CD, Hope and Fear. Rothchild was also featured on This American Life on Showtime, episode titled Growth Spurt.

Rothchild writes comedy feature films, scripted television, such as The Carrie Diaries, The Bold Type, Huge In France, GLOW and THE BABY SITTERS CLUB. She was also a regular blogger about relationships for Psychology Today Magazine and Huffington Post. Her LA Weekly article "How To Get Divorced By 30" about her failed starter marriage, spawned a memoir published by Penguin. Rothchild was a Co Executive Producer and writer for seasons 1, 2 and 3 on the hit Netflix series GLOW. She was nominated for an Emmy, Golden Globe, Writer's Guild Award, Producer's Guild Award for her work on GLOW.

Her debut novel, Blood Sugar, was published by Putnam in 2022.

== Students ==
- How To Get Divorced By 30, Penguin, January 2010. ISBN 978-0-452-29599-5
- Blood Sugar, G.P. Putnam's Sons, April 2022. ISBN 978-0593331545
