= Growth stock =

Type of equity in finance

In finance, a growth stock is a stock of a company that generates substantial and sustainable positive cash flow and whose revenues and earnings are expected to increase at a faster rate than the average company within the same industry. A growth company typically has some sort of competitive advantage (a new product, a breakthrough patent, overseas expansion) that allows it to fend off competitors. Growth stocks usually pay smaller dividends, as the companies typically reinvest most retained earnings in capital-intensive projects.

== Criteria ==
Analysts compute return on equity (ROE) by dividing a company's net income into average common equity. To be classified as a growth stock, analysts generally expect companies to achieve a 15 percent or higher return on equity. CAN SLIM is a method which identifies growth stocks and was created by William O'Neil a stock broker and publisher of Investor's Business Daily. In academic finance, the Fama–French three-factor model relies on book-to-market ratios (B/M ratios) to identify growth vs. value stocks. Some advisors suggest investing half the portfolio using the value approach and other half using the growth approach.

The definition of a "growth stock" differs among some well-known investors. For example, Warren Buffett does not differentiate between value and growth investing. In his 1992 letter to shareholders, he stated that many analysts consider growth and value investing to be opposites which he characterized "fuzzy thinking." Furthermore, Buffett cautions investors against overpaying for growth stocks, noting that growth projections are often overly optimistic. Instead, he prioritizes companies with a durable competitive advantage and a high return on capital, rather than focusing solely on revenue or earnings growth.

Peter Lynch classifies stocks into four categories: "Slow Growers," "Stalwarts," "Fast Growers," and "Turnarounds." He is known for focusing on what he calls "Fast Growers" referring to companies that grow at rates of 20% or higher. However, like Buffett, Lynch also believes in not overpaying for stocks, emphasizing that investors should use their "edge" to find companies with high earnings potential that are not yet overvalued. He recommends investing in companies with P/E ratios equal to or lower than their growth rates, and suggests holding these investments for three to five years. He is often credited for popularizing the PEG ratio to analyze growth stocks.

== Valuation and risk ==
Growth stocks are often valued on the basis of expected future earnings and revenues rather than current income distributions. Fidelity defines growth stocks as companies whose earnings or revenues are expected to grow faster than the market average.

This reliance on future expectations can make growth stocks more sensitive to changes in valuation and market sentiment. Nasdaq notes that growth stocks often carry higher valuation multiples than the broad market and tend to be more volatile than the market average.

== See also ==
- Alternate stock categorizations:
  - Turnaround stock
  - Value stock
- Treatment of growth:
  - Sustainable growth rate § From a financial perspective
  - Stock valuation § Growth rate
  - Earnings growth
  - PEG ratio
  - PVGO
  - Valuation using discounted cash flows § Determine the continuing value
  - Benjamin Graham formula
