= Jeffrey Vinik =

American businessman

Jeffrey N. Vinik
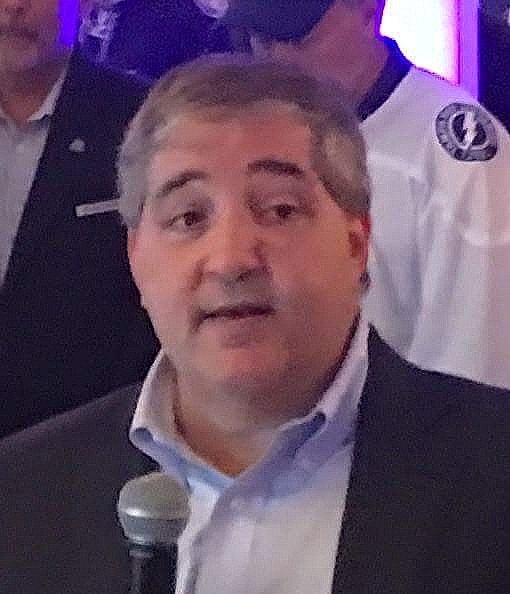
- Vinik in 2017
- Born: March 22, 1959 (age 67); Deal, New Jersey, U.S.
- Education: Duke University (BS); Harvard Business School (MBA)
- Occupations: Businessman, philanthropist
- Known for: Owner of professional sports teams
- Spouse: Penny Vinik
- Awards: Two-time Stanley Cup champion

Jeffrey N. Vinik (born March 22, 1959) is an American investor and sports team owner. He worked at Fidelity Investments and managed a private hedge fund, and from 2010 until October 24, 2024 was majority owner of the Tampa Bay Lightning and a minority owner of the Boston Red Sox. He served on the board of directors for Liverpool Football Club of the Premier League from 2010–2013.

== Early life ==
Vinik was born to a Jewish family in Deal, New Jersey. He graduated Phi Beta Kappa from Duke University in 1981 with a bachelor of science in civil engineering. He also obtained an MBA from Harvard Business School in 1985.

== Career ==
Vinik managed the Fidelity Magellan Fund from 1992 to 1996, where he averaged 17% annual returns. After leaving Fidelity, he started hedge fund Vinik Asset Management, with partners including Michael Gordon (now President of Fenway Sports Group). He made investors 93.8% in his first 11 months and approximately 50% a year for the next three years. At the end of 2000, Vinik returned investors $4.2 billion and focused on managing his own portfolio. Vinik and his partners closed down the fund in December 2013, and distributed $9 billion in assets.

In 2010, he purchased the Tampa Bay Lightning from Oren Koules and Len Barrie for $170 million. In January 2011, he purchased the Tampa Bay Storm. The Storm folded in December 2017.

In 2020, the Lightning won the Stanley Cup Championship, defeating the Dallas Stars 4 games to 2. Vinik could not be in the NHL's bubbles in Edmonton or Toronto, so he called into his players' locker room celebration, "congratulating them for their second Stanley Cup championship in team history" after their win over the Stars, according to Pat Pickens of NHL.com. Vinik, who purchased the franchise in 2010, was in Florida watching the Lightning complete their 18-7 run through the Stanley Cup Playoffs and "had to tell his players how happy he was." He said on a video call, "Hey guys, awesome job. So many years in the making, with new guys and the guys who have been here for a while, unbelievable effort. Dominant through the playoffs. You deserve it". In Tampa, Alexis Muellner writes winning hockey has "been the goal since" Vinik bought the team in 2010. The Stanley Cup is "one of the hardest trophies to win in sports." The achievement has been "as much a goal for the organization as has its widespread efforts to transform the community". Sports Business Journal profiled Vinik in 2015 following the Lightning's second appearance in the Stanley Cup Finals.

On October 24, 2024 Vinik Sports Group finalized the sale of a majority ownership stake in the Tampa Bay Lightning to a group of investors led by Doug Ostrover and Marc Lipschultz. Vinik will maintain control of the team for 3 years following the sale.

== Philanthropy ==
In 1998, Vinik and his wife, Penny, donated $1.25 million to endow a professorship at Duke's engineering school. The next year, they donated $5 million towards facilities at the engineering school. In 2012, they donated $10 million to create a challenge fund to endow associate and full professorships dedicated to addressing complex societal challenges. He donated $1.5 million to build a new Jewish Community Center in South Tampa. With his wife, he also donated to Vanderbilt University in 2016-2017.

After his October 2024 sale of a majority ownership stake in the Tampa Bay Lightning, the Vinik Family donated $20M to give every full-time employee of the Tampa Bay Lightning a $50K bonus.

== Awards and honors ==
- Two-time Stanley Cup Champion (as owner of the Tampa Bay Lightning) - 2020, 2021

Sporting positions
Preceded by Oren Koules; Len Barrie	Tampa Bay Lightning owner 2010–present	Incumbent
