= William Danoff =

American investment manager

William A. Danoff
- Born: 1959 (age 66–67); United States
- Education: Harvard College (B.A), The Wharton School University of Pennsylvania (MBA)
- Occupation: Portfolio manager
- Employer: Fidelity Investments
- Known for: Manager of Fidelity Contrafund
- Spouse: Ami Kuan Danoff

William Danoff (born 1959–60) is an American investment manager who is known for being a vice-president and portfolio manager of Fidelity Contrafund. For a time, the Contrafund was one of the largest managed stock or bond mutual funds run by one person.

== Early life and education ==
Danoff received a degree in history from Harvard in 1982 and an MBA from Wharton in 1986.

== Career ==
First joining Fidelity as an analyst in 1986, Danoff trained under Peter Lynch, who managed Fidelity's Magellan Fund in the 1970s.

William Danoff became a manager of Fidelity Investments's flagship mutual fund Fidelity Contrafund in 1990. He was the sole manager of the fund from 1990 until 2025, when Jason Weiner and Asher Anolic were named as co-managers of the fund along with Danoff.

Prior to the appointment of Weiner and Anolic, Contrafund was one of the largest sole-manager funds in the world.

As of 2025, Fidelity Contrafund holds $280 billion in assets and is one of the largest actively-managed mutual funds.

== Philanthropy ==
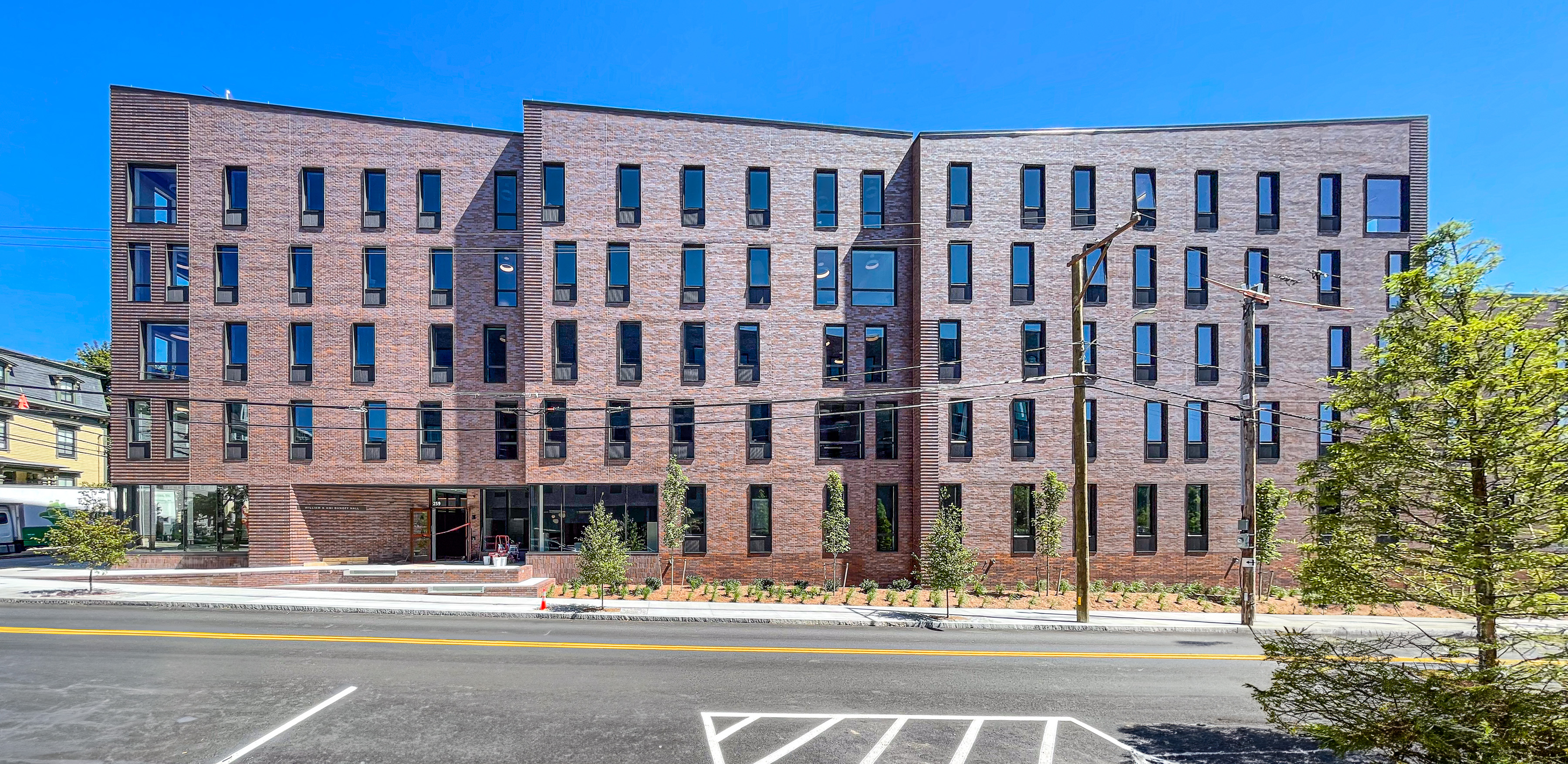
William & Ami Danoff Hall at Brown University

Danoff and his wife have been board members and supporters of Harvard College, as well as several community organizations in Greater Boston. Brown University named a residence hall and planned life sciences research laboratory after the couple, "in recognition of a generous gift."

== See also ==
- Fidelity Contrafund
- Peter Lynch
- Gerald Tsai
- Fidelity Investments
- Stock valuation
- Stock market
