= Wealth Lab =

Electronic trading and analysis platform

Wealth Lab (WABS) is an electronic trading platform originally developed by Dion Kurczek, Brett Corrigan, and Aristotle Varner and released in 2000. The software was acquired by Fidelity Investments in 2004 and made available as Wealth-Lab Pro for Fidelity customers (discontinued in August 2021). As a trading platform, users can develop and deploy automatic trading strategies for various financial markets, including equities, futures, forex, options, and cryptocurrencies.

== Overview ==
Wealth-Lab (sometimes stylized WealthLab) employs an integrated programming environment based on C# syntax which includes a proprietary scripting language, WealthScript. Although geared towards programmers, the platform includes an optional drag & drop interface.

In its standard installation, several market data sources are provided, such as Yahoo! Finance's free End Of Day data. Users can also lease real-time market data from external sources, such as Commodity System Inc. In addition to typical market data formats such as candlesticks, lines, and OHLC, Wealth-Lab also supports some less common formats such as kagi chart, Renko, and equicandle. The software also gives access to standard technical analysis indicators and fundamental analysis indicators.

Wealth-Lab includes exhaustive and Monte Carlo optimization methods and supports additional methods through an extension manager. Independent developers can create and share extensions; however, a monthly subscription cost is required to run the software on hosted servers.

=== Client availability ===
Wealth-Lab 8 is available by subscription to customers in multiple countries, including the United States and Canada.

Prior to August 2020, two legacy versions of Wealth-Lab existed. Wealth-Lab "Pro" was available to Fidelity premium account holders in the US only. Consumers outside of the US and Canada could obtain a version of the software known as Wealth-Lab "Developer" via the support website. The difference between the two versions primarily concerned their use of market data streams, custom software extensions, and technical support.

In August 2020, Fidelity discontinued the "Pro" version and transitioned customers to use Wealth-Lab Developer 6. Afterwards, the original Wealth Lab team rewrote the codebase and independently released Wealth-Lab 7 internationally in March 2021.

=== Technical support ===
All Wealth-Lab software users can get supplemental help designing and debugging their strategies via the developer community on the forums and wiki found on the support website. Supplemental programming help for creating strategies or extensions is also available at cost by submitting a Concierge support request.

== Extensions ==
Wealth-Lab 8 allows for integration of brokers and historical/realtime data providers, optimizers, position sizing methods, compiled strategies, reusable method libraries, performance visualizers, chart drawing tools, Building Block Strategy Rules, and more.

- Brokers/Data: Interactive Brokers, Tradier, Alpaca, and multiple via Medved Trader
- Crypto brokers/Data: Binance, Kraken, KuCoin
- Data providers: IQFeed, EODHD, CSI, CBOE, FinancialModelingPrep, Morningstar, Nasdaq, QuoteMedia, Stooq, Tiingo, TwelveData, MetaTrader, Norgate Data, CryptoCompare, and more
- Indicator libraries: TASC Magazine Indicators, Ichimoku Cloud, Advanced Smoothers, Community Library, Power Pack Indicators (and Position Sizers)
- Power Pack Visualizers: Analysis Series, Contribution, Metacorrelation, Streaks, Position Metrics
- Candlestick Genetic Evolver, Candlestick Pattern detection
- Optimizers: Genetic Optimizer, Particle Swarm Optimizer
- Analysis Tools: Neuro-Lab, Monte Carlo-Lab, Indicator Profiler, and others by finantic
