= List of mutual funds in the United States by assets under management =

This is a list of mutual funds and ETFs in the United States ordered by assets under management as of 28 March 2019. The numbers listed below are from the Lipper Performance Report.

| Rank | Fund name | Assets (millions of USD) |
|---|---|---|
| 1 | SPDR S&P 500 ETF | $ 260,765.80 |
| 2 | Vanguard 500 Idx Adm | $ 256,872.60 |
| 3 | Vanguard TSM Idx Adm | $ 209,796.70 |
| 4 | Fidelity 500 Index Fund | $ 179,000.00 |
| 5 | iShares:Core S&P 500 | $ 159,711.30 |
| 6 | Vanguard TSM Idx Inst+ | $ 152,993.40 |
| 7 | Vanguard Tot I S Inv | $ 135,697.90 |
| 8 | Vanguard TSM Idx Inv | $ 133,038.00 |
| 9 | Vanguard TSM Idx Inst | $ 130,675.60 |
| 10 | Vanguard Instl Indx Inst | $ 114,203.60 |
| 11 | Vanguard Instl Indx InsP | $ 108,718.90 |
| 12 | Vanguard TSM Idx ETF | $ 107,956.60 |
| 13 | Vanguard 500 Idx ETF | $ 102,816.00 |
| 14 | Vanguard Tot I S Ins + | $ 101,802.00 |
| 15 | Vanguard Tot Bd II Inv | $ 99,615.00 |
| 16 | Fidelity Contrafund | $ 91,253.60 |
| 17 | Vanguard Tot Bd Adm | $ 90,719.00 |
| 18 | American Funds Gro A | $ 86,400.20 |
| 19 | Vanguard Wellington Adm | $ 86,160.60 |
| 20 | American Funds Inc A | $ 72,054.90 |
| 21 | Vanguard Tot I S Adm | $ 70,233.60 |
| 22 | Vanguard Dev Mkt ETF | $ 70,070.50 |
| 23 | Dodge & Cox Stock | $ 69,989.20 |
| 24 | Invesco QQQ Trust 1 | $ 68,001.90 |
| 25 | Vanguard Tot Bd II Inst | $ 67,996.40 |

== See also ==
- List of electronic trading platforms
