= Abigail Johnson =

American billionaire and businesswoman

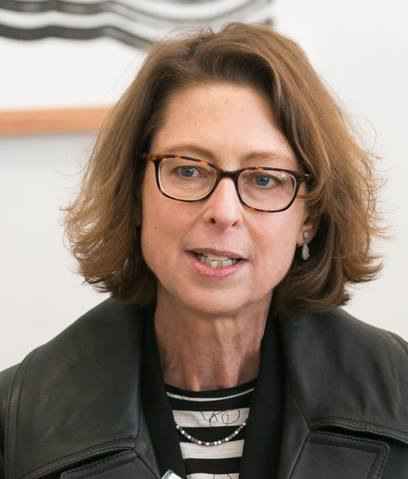
- Johnson in 2022
- Born: Abigail Pierrepont Johnson; December 19, 1961 (age 64); Boston, Massachusetts, U.S.
- Education: William Smith College (BA); Harvard University (MBA)
- Title: Chair, CEO, and President of Fidelity Investments; Chair of Fidelity International
- Spouse: Christopher McKown (m. 1988)
- Children: 2
- Father: Edward Johnson III
- Relatives: Edward C. Johnson II (grandfather)

Abigail Johnson (born December 19, 1961) is the chairman and chief executive officer (CEO) of Fidelity Investments. The company was founded by her grandfather, Edward C. Johnson II, in 1946, and her father, Edward Johnson III, was its CEO when she joined. Johnson became president in 2012, CEO in 2014, and chairman in 2016.

As chairman and CEO, she has overseen the firm's expansion into digital assets and new investment products. In 2018, Johnson introduced cryptocurrency investment at Fidelity, enabling institutional investors to trade Bitcoin and Ether. She has been included on the Forbes list of the World's 100 Most Powerful Women since 2015.

She is involved in the Boston fine arts community, supporting the Museum of Fine Arts and the Institute of Contemporary Art.

== Early life ==
Johnson was born in Boston, Massachusetts on December 19, 1961. Although neither Johnson nor her younger siblings felt pressured to join the family business, as a child, Johnson was attracted to her father’s work.

Johnson attended Buckingham Browne & Nichols School, a private school in Cambridge, Massachusetts, and then graduated from William Smith College with a bachelor's degree in art history in 1984. In 1985, she began working as a consultant at Booz Allen Hamilton, where she met her husband. She completed an MBA at Harvard Business School in 1988.

== Career ==
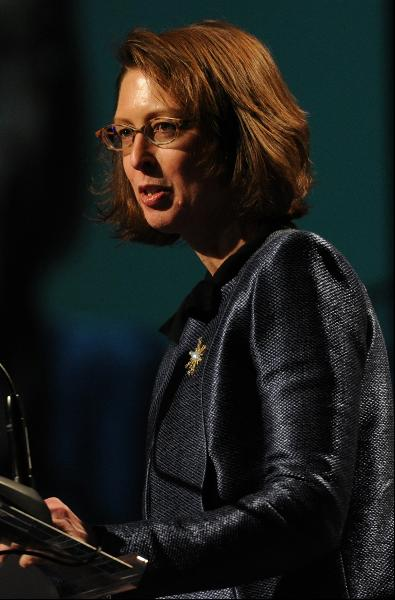
Johnson at the Boston Convention and Exhibition Center in 2012.

Upon graduating from Harvard Business School in 1988, Johnson joined Fidelity Investments, which her grandfather Edward C. Johnson II founded in 1946 and of which her father Edward Johnson III was then the CEO. She began as an analyst and portfolio manager.

In 2001, she was promoted to president of Fidelity Asset Management. During her time in that position, Johnson unsuccessfully attempted to orchestrate a vote to remove her father as CEO over disagreements about his business decisions.

In 2005, she became Head of Retail, Workplace, and Institutional Business. She was named president in 2012. In 2014, she became CEO, and in 2016 she also became chairman.

In 2018, Johnson introduced cryptocurrency investment at Fidelity, making it possible for institutional investors to trade Bitcoin and Ether. In November 2018, she was named head of Fidelity Financial Services.

As Chairman and CEO of Fidelity Investments,she has guided the firm’s expansion into digital assets and new investment products. During this period, Fidelity launched the Wise Origin Bitcoin Fund and broadened the services of Fidelity Digital Assets, strengthening the company’s position in cryptocurrency custody and trading. Wise Origin Bitcoin Fund was eventually incorporated in 2020.

Johnson also oversaw growth in Fidelity’s technology and client-service operations. She reduced dependence on open-ended mutual funds, instead having the company focus on financial advice, brokerage services, and venture capital.

== Awards and recognition ==
Johnson has been a member of the Committee on Capital Markets Regulation, and a member of the board of directors of the Securities Industry and Financial Markets Association (SIFMA) and of MIT. She is the first and only woman on the board of the Financial Services Forum.

Johnson has been included on the Forbes list of the World's 100 Most Powerful Women since 2015. She was ranked 19th in 2015, 16th in 2016, seventh in 2017, fifth in 2018, seventh in 2019, ninth in 2020, sixth in 2021, fifth in 2022, eighth in 2023, sixth in 2024, and ninth in 2025.

In 2023, Johnson was ranked 13th on the list of Most Powerful Women by Fortune.

In 2024, American Banker recognized Johnson as the No. 2 Most Powerful Woman in Finance. And in 2025 she was ranked third on the publication’s Most Powerful Women in Finance list.

== Personal life ==
Johnson is married to Christopher J. McKown. They have two daughters.

In 2002, she bought a seaside house in Nantucket Island for $9.72 million. As of 2006, she owned an estate in Milton, Massachusetts. She also owns an office building in London.

She supports the Boston Institute of Contemporary Art, donating over $50,000 in 2023-2024. She is also an honorary advisor at the Boston Museum of Fine Arts.

=== Political contributions ===
In 2015, Johnson donated $2,700, the maximum amount legally allowed for presidential primary campaigns, to Republican candidate Jeb Bush. In 2016, she donated about $330,000 to Hillary Clinton's campaign and the Democratic National Committee.

In 2024, Johnson was reported to have attended a fundraising event for President Joe Biden’s re-election campaign.

== See also ==
- Lists of billionaires
