= Dietrich Stephan =

American geneticist

Dietrich A. Stephan
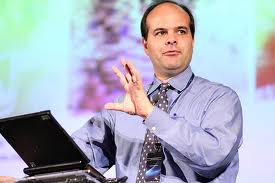
- Born: Pittsburgh, Pennsylvania
- Occupations: Scientist and entrepreneur
- Known for: Co-founder of Navigenics

Dietrich A. Stephan is an American human geneticist and entrepreneur who works in personalized medicine.

Stephan was CEO of NeuBase Therapeutics and a general partner in Cyto Ventures. Before NeuBase, Stephan was CEO of LifeX and chairman and professor of human genetics at the University of Pittsburgh. Earlier, he was founding chairman of the Neurogenomics Division at the Translational Genomics Research Institute. Stephan has founded or co-founded 14 biotechnology companies and was co-founder of Navigenics, a personal genomics company. Most recently Stephan was Executive Chair of Enhanced Genomics, a company which swiftly wound up its lab operations under his stewardship

== Academic career ==
Stephan received his B.Sc. in biology from Carnegie Mellon University and his Ph.D. in human molecular genetics from the University of Pittsburgh, followed by a fellowship at the National Human Genome Research Institute.

In 2003, Stephan worked at Translational Genomics Research Institute (TGen) as a senior investigator and founding chairman of its Department of Neurogenomics.
