= Fidelity Contrafund =

Mutual fund

Fidelity Contrafund is a mutual fund sponsored by Fidelity Investments. As of September 2026, the fund had assets under management of $145 billion, or $280 billion when including all classes, and an expense ratio of 0.74%. It is the second-largest actively-managed mutual fund in the US by assets, after Growth Fund of America, managed by American Funds. The fund's name comes from its original strategy of contrarian investing; however, the fund has since changed its strategy to growth investing and its largest positions are in the major technology stocks.

== History ==
The fund was launched on May 17, 1967. Richard "Dick" Dworsky managed the fund from its inception until December 1983, during which time the fund produced an average annual return of 10.2%. Alan Leifer then managed the fund until 1989, when Jeffrey Vinik became manager.

William Danoff managed the fund from September 1990 until December 2026. In 2025, Asher Anolic and Jason Weiner were added as co-managers of the fund.

== Financial performance ==
Year	Contrafund	S&P 500	Difference
2025	+21.80%	+17.88%	+3.92%
2024	+35.97%	+25.02%	+10.95%
2023	+39.33%	+26.29%	+13.04%
2022	-28.26%	-18.11%	-10.15%
2021	+24.36%	+28.71%	-4.35%
2020	+32.58%	+18.40%	+14.18%
2019	+29.98%	+31.49%	-1.51%
2018	-2.13%	-4.38%	+2.25%
2017	+32.21%	+21.83%	+10.38%
2016	+3.36%	+11.96%	-8.60%
2015	+6.46%	+1.38%	+5.08%
2014	+9.56%	+13.69%	-4.13%
2013	+34.15%	+32.39%	+1.76%
2012	+16.26%	+16.00%	+0.26%
2011	-0.14%	+2.11%	-2.25%
2010	+16.93%	+15.06%	+1.87%
2009	+29.23%	+26.46%	+2.77%
2008	-37.16%	-37.00%	-0.16%
2007	+19.78%	+5.49%	+14.29%
2006	+11.54%	+15.79%	-4.25%
2005	+16.23%	+4.91%	+11.32%
2004	+15.06%	+10.88%	+4.18%
2003	+27.96%	+28.68%	-0.72%
2002	-4.57%	-22.10%	+17.53%
2001	-1.81%	-11.89%	+10.08%
2000	-15.97%	-9.10%	-6.87%
1999	+40.22%	+21.04%	+19.18%
1998	+21.71%	+28.58%	-6.87%
1997	+23.03%	+33.36%	-10.33%
1996	+22.53%	+22.96%	-0.43%
1995	+37.24%	+37.58%	-0.34%
1994	-1.11%	+1.32%	-2.43%
1993	+22.05%	+10.08%	+11.97%
1992	+8.78%	+7.62%	+1.16%
1991	+47.50%	+30.47%	+17.03%
1990	+3.70%	-3.10%	+6.80%
1989	+34.62%	+31.69%	+2.93%
1988	+17.38%	+16.61%	+0.77%
1987	+1.40%	+5.25%	-3.85%
1986	+15.54%	+18.67%	-3.13%
1985	+31.52%	+31.73%	-0.21%
1984	-2.48%	+6.27%	-8.75%
1983	+24.12%	+22.56%	+1.56%
1982	+26.34%	+21.55%	+4.79%
1981	-3.80%	-4.92%	+1.12%
1980	+33.15%	+32.50%	+0.65%
1979	+22.05%	+10.08%	+11.97%
1978	+9.24%	+6.57%	+2.67%
1977	-4.80%	-7.16%	+2.36%
1976	+25.44%	+23.93%	+1.51%
1975	+36.21%	+37.23%	-1.02%
1974	-27.80%	-26.47%	-1.33%
1973	-18.90%	-14.69%	-4.21%
1972	+21.43%	+19.00%	+2.43%
1971	+16.05%	+14.30%	+1.75%
1970	+0.44%	+3.86%	-3.42%
