= Boston College Lynch School of Education and Human Development =

Coordinates: 42°20′2.0″N 71°10′6.3″W

Lynch School
- Private school of education
- Boston College
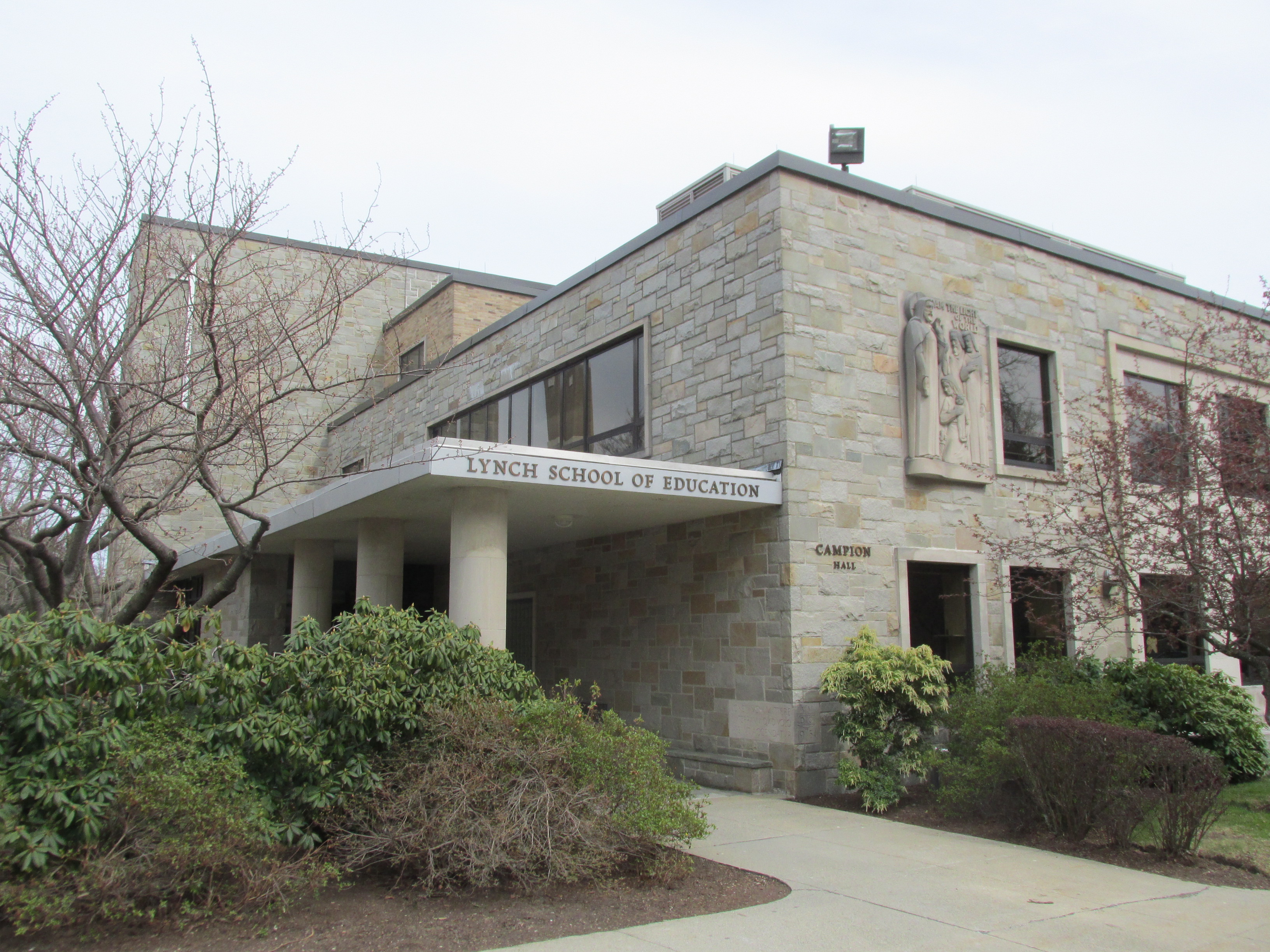
- Campion Hall
- Location: Chestnut Hill, Massachusetts, U.S.
- Full name: Carolyn A. and Peter S. Lynch School of Education and Human Development
- Abbreviation: LSEHD
- Established: September 22, 1952; 73 years ago
- Named for: Carolyn Lynch and Peter Lynch
- Colors: Maroon and gold
- Gender: Co-educational
- Dean: Stanton Wortham
- Undergraduates: 579
- Postgraduates: 814
- Website: bc.edu/lsoe

The Boston College Lynch School of Education and Human Development (abbreviated as Lynch School) is the school of education at Boston College.

Founded in 1952, the Lynch school offers graduate and undergraduate programs in education, psychology, and human development.

== History ==
Prior to World War II, Boston College's Department of Education within the College of Arts and Sciences was organized to prepare teachers, however student interest dropped after the war. Department chairman Charles F. Donovan, S.J., a 1933 graduate who received his Ph.D. from Yale, rearranged the curriculum and established a major in education. But changes in the field of education, including increased certification requirements for public school teachers in Massachusetts, made the need for a school of education apparent.

When it opened on September 22, 1952, the School of Education was Boston College's first coeducational school on the Chestnut Hill campus. Donovan as dean was assisted by Marie M. Gearan, who served as dean of women. In 1954, Campion Hall was designed by the Boston firm of Maginnis and Walsh, the primary architect for the university's campus. Archbishop Richard Cushing presided over a dedication ceremony on September 22, 1955. Charles Frank Smith Jr., Boston College’s first tenured black professor, taught at the Lynch School from 1968 to 1996. At one time beginning in 1973, an undergraduate final teaching practicum sent students during a semester to gain experience outside of Massachusetts, including Indian reservations, and to foreign countries. In 1999, philanthropists Carolyn and Peter Lynch, an alumnus and financial investor, donated more than $10 million to Boston College, then the largest individual gift ever made to the University. In honor of the gift, the School of Education was renamed in their honor.

== Programs of study ==
The Lynch School offers Bachelor of Arts (B.A.) degrees in Elementary Education, Secondary Education, and Applied Psychology and Human Development; 17 Master's (M.Ed, M.A., M.S.) degree specialties along with several dual degree programs; and a Doctor of Education (Ed.D.) in Educational Leadership along with five Doctor of Philosophy (Ph.D.) programs in Curriculum and Instruction, Higher Education, Applied Developmental and Educational Psychology, Counseling Psychology and Measurement, Evaluation, Statistics, and Assessment. The school's M.A. in Mental Health Counseling is accredited by the Masters in Psychology and Counseling Accreditation Council (MPCAC). The school has over 60 full-time faculty members, more than 35 part-time faculty members and another 60 researchers, approximately 580 undergraduate students and 815 graduate students, and about 20 academic programs in education, human development, and psychology.

== Notable faculty ==
- Andy Hargreaves, is the Thomas More Brennan Chair in Education. The mission of the chair is to promote social justice and connect theory and practice in education. Hargreaves's teaching and research at Boston College concentrates on sustainable leadership, professional learning communities, educational change and the emotions of teaching.
