= David Agus =

American physician

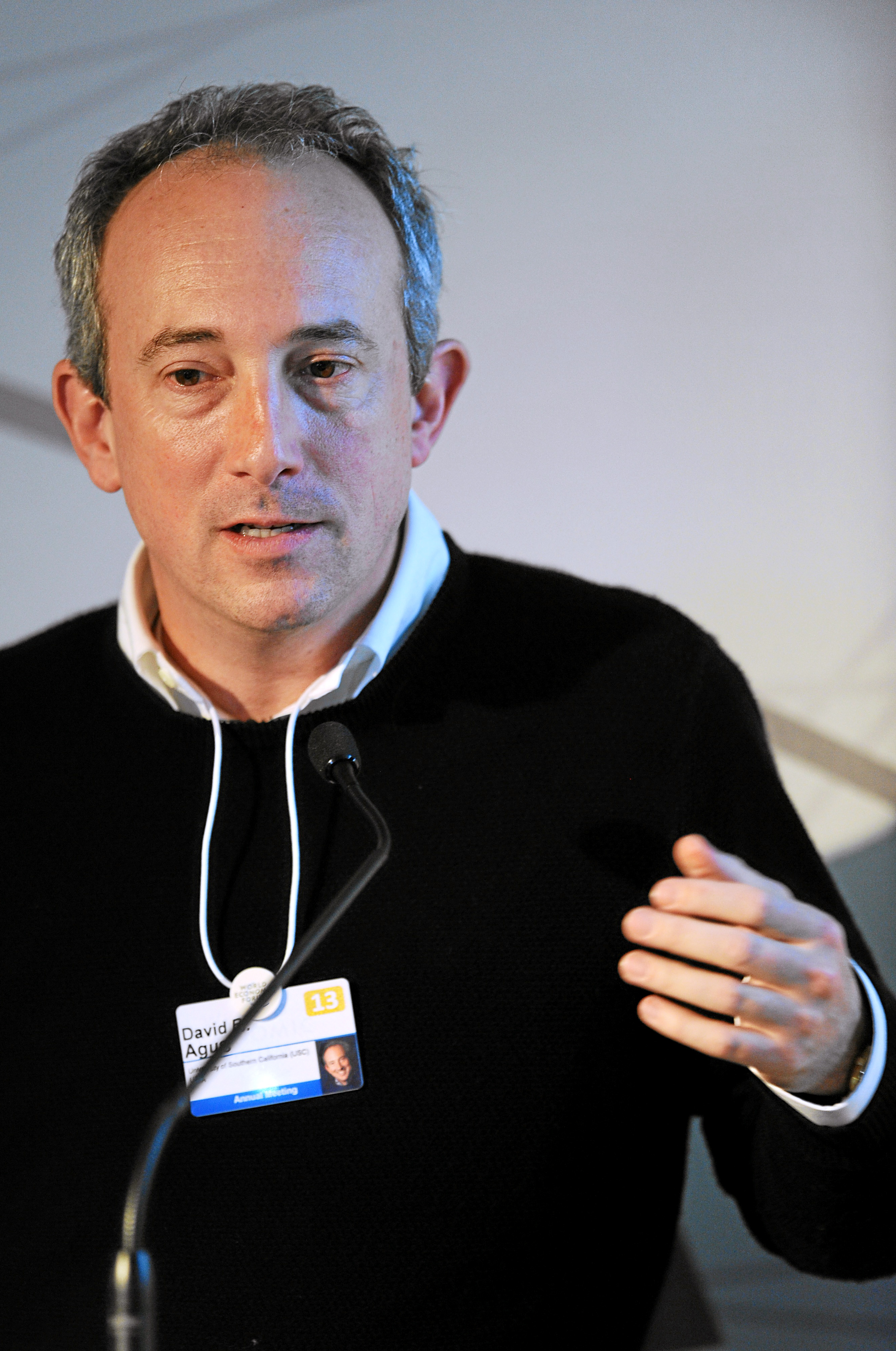
- Agus at the World Economic Forum Annual Meeting in 2013
- Education: Princeton University (B.S.); University of Pennsylvania (M.D)
- Known for: Co-founder of: Sensei; Applied Proteomics; Navigenics; Oncology.com; Author of: The End of Illness (2012); A Short Guide to a Long Life (2014); The Lucky Years (2016); The Book of Animal Secrets (2023)
- Spouse: Amy Joyce (née Povich) (m. 1994)
- Children: 2
- Scientific career
- Fields: Personal genomics; Biotechnology; Cancer
- Workplaces: Professor of Medicine and Engineering, USC Keck School of Medicine and USC Viterbi School of Engineering; Founding director and CEO, Ellison Medical Institute

David B. Agus (AY-gəs; /ˈeɪgəs/) is an American oncologist and author specializing in advanced cancer. He serves as professor of medicine and biomedical engineering at the University of Southern California Keck School of Medicine and Viterbi School of Engineering, as well as the founding director and CEO of the Ellison Medical Institute. He is also the cofounder of several personalized medicine companies, and was a contributor to CBS News on health topics.

Agus has developed new cancer treatments with the aid of private foundations and government agencies, including the National Cancer Institute. Agus has also served as chair of the Global Agenda Council on Genetics for the World Economic Forum.

== Early life and education ==
Agus grew up in Baltimore. His father was a nephrologist, and his grandfather Rabbi Jacob Agus was a theologian and scholar. He graduated cum laude in molecular biology from Princeton University in 1987 and received his medical degree from the University of Pennsylvania Perelman School of Medicine in 1991. He completed his residency training at Johns Hopkins Hospital and completed his oncology fellowship training at Memorial Sloan-Kettering Cancer Center in New York. He spent two years at the National Institutes of Health as a Howard Hughes Medical Institute-NIH Research Scholar.

== Career ==
Agus was an attending physician in the Department of Medical Oncology and head of the Laboratory of Tumor Biology at the Memorial Sloan-Kettering Cancer Center in New York. He was also Assistant Professor of Medicine at Cornell University Medical Center.

As director of the Spielberg Family Center for Applied Proteomics at Cedars-Sinai Medical Center in Los Angeles, he led multidisciplinary research on the development and use of proteomic technologies to guide individualized medical treatment. The center grew out of earlier clinical projects at Cedars-Sinai, where Agus served as an attending physician in oncology, which observed striking differences between the aggressiveness of prostate cancer in certain patients and their ability to respond to treatment.

In 2009, he joined the University of Southern California, where he is professor of medicine and biomedical engineering at the USC Keck School of Medicine and Viterbi School of Engineering. That year, he became founding director of the Center for Applied Molecular Medicine at USC.

Agus is the founding director and CEO of the Ellison Medical Institute, which researches preventive medicine and treatments for cancer. The institute was established in 2016 with a $200 million donation from Larry Ellison.

Agus's research has focused on the use of technology to model cancer and on new cancer treatments. He also maintains an oncology practice to apply his team's research discoveries to the patients under his care.

He has founded and co-founded several companies, including Oncology.com, Navigenics, a personalized medicine company, Applied Proteomics, co-founded with Danny Hillis, Sensei, a wellness and lifestyle company, and Sensei Agriculture were both co-founded with Larry Ellison.

=== Writing ===
Agus has written several books, including The End of Illness (2012), A Short Guide to a Long Life (2014), The Lucky Years: How to Thrive in the Brave New World of Health (2016), and The Book of Animal Secrets: Nature’s Lesson for a Long and Happy Life (2023).

==== Plagiarism controversy ====
On March 6, 2023, the Los Angeles Times reported that there was plagiarism in Agus's book The Book of Animal Secrets: Nature's Lessons for a Long and Happy Life, with the word choice in some instances found to be identical to that in existing sources. In response, Agus postponed the book's publication by Simon and Schuster, which was scheduled for the following day, until the sections could be rewritten.

On March 17, 2023, the Times further reported that Agus's first three books, The End of Illness, A Short Guide to a Long Life, and The Lucky Years: How to Thrive in the Brave New World of Health, contained material that was identical to passages from other books, articles in scientific journals, science blogs, online articles, and Wikipedia articles. Almost all of the copied paragraphs or passages did not attribute the original authors. Agus stated he was not aware of, nor had any involvement in, the passages that were supposedly plagiarised and noted the specific passages were written by his co-writer Kristin Loberg. Several other works that co-written by Loberg were found to have contained plagiarism, including David Perlmutter's Grain Brain (2013), which plagiarized The End of Illness. Loberg later issued a public apology taking "complete responsibility" for the oversight.

=== Television show ===
Agus hosted the Paramount+ television show The Checkup with Dr. David Agus, which was broadcast in December 2022. In the show, Agus discussed different medical issues with celebrity guests who have experience with those health concerns.

His book was adapted into a television special titled The End of Illness with Dr. David B. Agus which aired on PBS in 2012. In 2013, Agus became a contributor to CBS News.

== Personal life ==
Agus is married to actress Amy Joyce Povich, daughter of Maury Povich. They have two children.
