= Turnaround stock =

A turnaround stock is a company's stock whose underlying fundamentals such as sales, revenue, cash flow, etc. have declined for a period of time but investors believe the company still has the potential to "turn around" and perform well in the future.

These types of stocks are usually associated with value investing. Value investors invest in depressed prices of turnaround stocks in the hopes of the company rebounding.

== Criteria ==
Different investors have given various definitions of a turn around stock. Peter Lynch famously classifies turnarounds as one of his main six stock categories. Lynch defines turnarounds as stock that have been battered and depressed for a period of time yet have the potential to grow significantly and very quickly. He views these stocks as high-risk, high-reward.

These stocks typically have low P/Es or P/Bs making them potentially undervalued. Many turnaround companies are in serious debt and on the brink of bankruptcy. Catalysts for recovery often include new management, debt restructuring, and improving macroeconomic factors among others.

== Strategy ==
Investing in turnaround companies involves finding and buying stocks of a company in distress that are expected to recover financially or otherwise. This type of investing was popularized by figures such as Peter Lynch.

Investors often look for management changes, realistic turnaround plans, macro or company-related tailwinds.

Some of the associated risks are further deterioration of the fundamentals, long recovery periods, execution failures, legal issues, permanent capital loss, and opportunity costs.

Some notable examples include Apple Inc. after Steve Jobs' return, General Motors after structuring, Ford Motor Company after the "One Ford", and more recently Starbucks.

== See also ==
- Value stock
- Growth stock
- Distressed securities
- Restructuring
- Peter Lynch
