= Reisha Perlmutter =

American contemporary artist

- Born: May 21, 1990 (age 36); Naples, Florida
- Citizenship: American
- Education: School of Art Institute of Chicago, New York Academy of Art
- Occupation: Painter
- Website: reishaperlmutter.com

Reisha Perlmutter is an American contemporary artist known for her hyperrealistic paintings that focus on the representation of the human body in natural settings.

== Biography ==
=== Early life and education ===
Perlmutter was born on May 21, 1990, in Naples, Florida, to an American celebrity doctor, David Perlmutter.

Following her early education in 2008, Perlmutter studied painting and Latin American Studies at Bates College until 2010. She then went to the School of Art Institute of Chicago and completed bachelor of fine arts in 2012. She continued her education at the New York Academy of Art, receiving a Master of Fine Arts in 2015.

Perlmutter also studied at Studio Escalier in Paris, France, and attended the International School of Drawing, Painting, and Sculpture in Umbria, Italy, during summer residencies.

=== Career ===
After the School of Art Institute of Chicago in 2012, she traveled to different cities in Europe, Mexico, and the United States, where she was engaged in free dives and photography. These underwater photographs later served as a basis for most of the underwater paintings of Perlmutter. Her work explores the interplay between human forms, water, light, and shadow, emphasizing the relationship between humans and the natural world.

In 2023, she collaborated with actress Kerry Washington, creating the painted and photographic cover art for Washington’s memoir Thicker Than Water.

=== Style ===
Perlmutter’s art style combines hyperrealism with brushwork and colors. By merging the contrast of light and shadow with the transparency of water, she depicts details to her subjects. Her work explores the interplay between human forms, water, light, and shadow, emphasizing the relationship between humans and the natural world. With this combination of realism and artistic expression, she shows the relationship between humans and nature.

== Selected exhibitions ==
Perlmutter's paintings have been a part of several exhibitions in art museums, fairs, galleries, and institutes in New York, Chicago, Los Angeles, San Francisco, Miami, Naples, and Fort Worth. She also exhibited her paintings internationally in Toronto, Munich, and Barcelona. Selected exhibitions include:

- Origin, Sea Salt, Naples, Florida (2016)
- WaterBodies, Southampton Cultural Center, New York (2016)
- SILENT WATERS, Benjamin Eck Galerie, Munich, Germany (2016)
- Immersed, East Hampton’s Roman Fine Art, New York (2017)
- Florida Contemporary, Arsenault Gallery, Naples, Florida (2017)
- Undercurrents, Fort Works Art, New York (2018)
- Fantasia, Spoke Art, San Francisco, California (2018)
- Bliss, New York Academy of Art, New York (2019)
- Prelude to a Dream, Christie's, Fort Worth, Texas (2020)
- Artists for Artists, Sotheby’s, New York (2021)
- Take Home a Nude, Sotheby’s, New York (2022)
- INCANDESCENCE, solo exhibition curated by DK Johnston, Arts Fund, New York (2023)
- 2024 25 Years of the Naples Art Institute Collection, Naples Art Institute, Naples, Florida
