= Stanton Wortham =

American anthropologist

Stanton E.F. Wortham is a teacher, scholar, and documentary film producer who is the inaugural Charles F. Donovan, S.J., Dean American professor at Boston College's Lynch School of Education and Human Development.

== Biography ==
An award-winning teacher, scholar, and documentary film producer, Stanton E. F. Wortham, Ph.D., serves as the Dean of the Boston College Lynch School of Education and Human Development. Wortham previously worked at the University of Pennsylvania’s Graduate School of Education, where he was the Judy and Howard Berkowitz Professor and associate dean for academic affairs. He spent 18 years as a professor and administrator at Penn, where he served twice as interim dean of the Graduate School of Education and won awards for teaching excellence, including the University of Pennsylvania Lindback Foundation Award for Distinguished Teaching.

A linguistic anthropologist and educational ethnographer with a particular expertise in how identities develop in human interactions, Wortham has conducted research spanning education, anthropology, linguistics, psychology, sociology, and philosophy.

Wortham is the author or editor of ten books and more than 100 articles and chapters that cover linguistic anthropology, discourse analysis, “learning identity” (how social identification and academic learning interconnect), and education in the new Latino diaspora.

For over 10 years, Wortham studied the experiences of Mexican immigrant students both in and outside of school as they adjusted to lives in communities with largely non-Latino populations.

As part of that project, Wortham was the executive producer of the 2014 documentary Adelante], which chronicles how a Mexican-immigrant and Irish-American community are revitalizing a once-struggling parish. Wortham has also written a book based on his research in the small town: Migration Narratives.
