= Phil Town =

American businessman

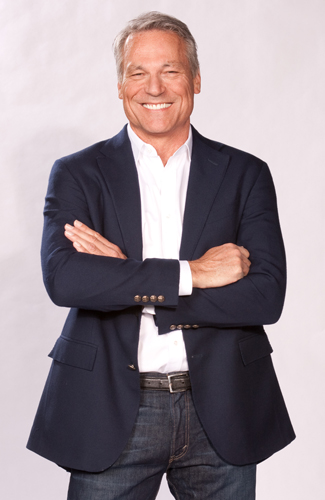
- Born: Philip Bradley Town; September 21, 1948 (age 78); Portland, Oregon, U.S.
- Education: University of California, San Diego (BA)
- Occupations: Author, Speaker
- Spouse: Melissa Town
- Children: Danielle Town
- Writing career
- Genre: Nonfiction
- Notable works: Rule #1, Payback Time, "InvestED"
- Website: www.ruleoneinvesting.com

Philip Bradley Town (born 21 September 1948) is an American investor, hedge fund manager, motivational speaker, and author of three books on financial investment which were the New York Times bestsellers.

In 2006, Town published his first book Rule #1: The Simple Strategy for Successful Investing in Only 15 Minutes a Week!, which was his handbook on making money quick. It appeared on the New York Times bestseller list, as well as Business Week's bestseller list and on USA Today's list of top business books. His second book, Payback Time, also reached the New York Times bestseller list. That book explains the concept of stockpiling stocks for long term high returns with low risk.

== Early life and education ==
Town was born in Portland, Oregon and graduated from Newport High School in 1966. After four attempts at college, he earned a Bachelor of Arts degree in philosophy from the University of California, San Diego.

== Career ==
In 1972, after serving nearly 4 years in the US Army, Town found himself sleeping in a tent in Flagstaff, Arizona and leading whitewater rafting trips down the Colorado River to get by.

In 1980, Town ran one of his rafting expeditions for trustees of the Outward Bound Program. The trip was nearly catastrophic when the boat almost capsized in a rough section of the Colorado River. After Town got everything back on track and everyone was safe again, one of the men told Town that he could be "doing better than pumping rubber all summer and living on welfare in the off-season."

In 2006, Random House released his book Rule #1: The Simple Strategy for Successful Investing in Only 15 Minutes a Week!, through its Crown imprint. It quickly rose to the #1 spot on the New York Times bestseller list. Rule #1 was also on Business Week's bestseller list and appeared on USA Today's list of top business books.

Town's second book, Payback Time: Making Big Money Is the Best Revenge! was released by Random House in March 2010 and immediately topped the NY Times bestseller list at #1. Payback Time explains the concept of 'Stockpiling' stocks for long term high returns with low risk.

In 2013, Town started a hedge fund based in Georgia. The fund is called Rule One Partners.

In 2018, Town co-authored the book, Invested: How Warren Buffett and Charlie Munger Taught Me to Master My Mind, My Emotions, and My Money (with a Little Help from My Dad), with his daughter, Danielle Town.

== Media appearances ==
Town guest appeared on multiple occasions on CNBC. He has been featured on The Millionaire Inside series and appears in the first and second episodes, "Your Guide to Wealth" and "Your Guide to Retiring Rich" along with David Bach and Barbara Corcoran. Town has also been a regular contributor to MSNBC's show Your Business, and has appeared on Maria Bartiromo's show Closing Bell.

Town also began organizing a live "3-Day Transformational Investing Workshop," where he teaches attendees how to use and apply the Rule #1 investing strategies. This workshop shows people how to invest with a low-risk, high yield Warren Buffett style approach.

Town owns a YouTube channel under the name Rule #1 Investing, and hosts a Transformational Investing Webinar with his wife, Melissa Town, on a weekly basis. Town and his daughter Danielle Town host the InvestED podcast.

== See also ==
- Value Investing
- Contrarian Investing
- Peter Lynch
- William Green (journalist)
- Warren Buffett
