= William Green (journalist) =

English journalist and author

- Born: August 26, 1968 (age 58); London, England
- Education: Eton College University of Oxford (BA) Columbia University (MS)
- Occupations: Journalist and author
- Website: williamgreenwrites.com

William Green is an English journalist and author who writes about investing and personal development. He is the author of Richer, Wiser, Happier: How the World's Greatest Investors Win in Markets and Life.

== Early life and education ==
William Green was born and raised in London, England. He attended Eton College where he studied English literature at the University of Oxford before earning a master's degree in journalism from Columbia University.

== Career ==
Green started his career in journalism, writing for publications such as Time, Fortune, Forbes, The New Yorker and The Economist. He has also worked as a ghostwriter. He is a senior advisor to the Global Value team at First Eagle Investments. In 2021, he published Richer, Wiser, Happier, a collection of interviews with over forty prominent investors.

== Published works ==
- The Great Minds of Investing (editor and writer, 2015)
- Richer, Wiser, Happier: How the World's Greatest Investors Win in Markets and Life (2021)
