= Navigenics =

Personal genomics company

- Type: Public (NYSE: TMO)
- Headquarters: Waltham, Massachusetts, USA
- Key people: Marc N. Casper (President & CEO)
- Website: www.thermofisher.com

Navigenics, Inc. was a privately held personal genomics company that used genetic testing to help people determine their individual risk for dozens of health conditions.

== History ==
Navigenics was co-founded in 2006 by David Agus, M.D., a prostate cancer specialist who is a professor of medicine at the University of Southern California and director of the USC Center for Applied Molecular Medicine and the USC Westside Prostate Cancer Center in Los Angeles, and Dietrich Stephan, Ph.D., member of the board of directors of the Personalized Medicine Coalition, current CEO of Silicon Valley Biosystems, former chairman of Neurogenomics and deputy director for discovery research at the Translational Genomics Research Institute.

In July 2012, Navigenics was acquired by Life Technologies, which was acquired by Thermo Fisher Scientific in February, 2014.

== Controversy in California ==
In June 2008, California health regulators sent cease-and-desist letters to Navigenics and 12 other genetic testing firms, including 23andMe. The state regulators asked the companies to prove a physician was involved in the ordering of each test and that state clinical laboratory licensing requirements were being fulfilled. The controversy sparked a flurry of interest in the relatively new field, as well as a number of media articles, including an opinion piece on Wired.com entitled, “Attention, California Health Dept.: My DNA Is My Data.” In August 2008, Navigenics and 23andMe received state licenses allowing the companies to continue to do business in California.
