= Edward C. Johnson II =

American businessman and lawyer

- Born: Edward Crosby Johnson II; January 19, 1898; Boston, Massachusetts, U.S.
- Died: April 2, 1984 (aged 86); Cataumet, Massachusetts, U.S.
- Education: Harvard University
- Occupation: Businessman
- Spouse: Elsie Livingston (m. 1924)
- Children: 2; including Edward III
- Relatives: Abigail Johnson (granddaughter)

Edward Crosby Johnson II (January 19, 1898 – April 2, 1984) was an American businessman and lawyer who founded Fidelity Investments.

== Biography ==
Edward Crosby Johnson II was born in Back Bay, Boston, Massachusetts, on January 19, 1898, to Samuel Johnson, a partner in the dry-goods firm C.F. Hovey and Co. and Josephine Johnson (née Forbush). Johnson came from a family of New England Puritan ancestry. He graduated from Milton Academy in 1916, and enlisted in the United States Naval Reserve as a second class radioman during World War I from August 1917 to July 1918. He graduated from Harvard College in 1920 and Harvard Law School in 1924.

After receiving a law degree, Johnson became an associate at Boston law firm Ropes, Gray, Boyden & Perkins and also became involved in stock market research. Diana B. Henriques wrote in 1995: "...those who knew Ed Johnson sensed...an openness to the new and the exotic. Most of all, there was a very un-Bostonian passion for the quick, rude, sharp-witted world of Wall Street." He was also described as a contrarian, which was considered a key to his success. When tuning into the market forces, he was bold when people were timid and vice versa.

He served as the president of the Fidelity Fund, incorporated on May 1, 1930, as well as the vice president and treasurer of the fund's board of directors. He took over the company from his father, Edward C. Johnson II, who was credited as Fidelity's founder. From 1946, he served as the founding chairman of Fidelity Management and Research. He is credited for introducing a new approach to mutual fund investing, which transformed mutual funds from savings into investment vehicles. He is also said to have taught investors to demand performance as an investment goal.By 1958, Johnson managed over $400 million combined with $357 million in the Fidelity Fund and $59 million in his new Puritan Fund. Beginning in 1969, Johnson chaired the board of Fidelity Management and Research.

He died in Cataumet, Massachusetts, of Alzheimer's disease in 1984, and his funeral was held at Milton's Universalist First Parish Church.
