= John Rothchild =

American writer (1945–2019)

- Born: John Harmon Rothchild; May 13, 1945; Norfolk, Virginia, U.S.
- Died: December 27, 2019 (aged 74); Virginia Beach, Virginia, U.S.
- Education: Yale University
- Occupation: Financial writer
- Spouse: Susan Berns (m. 1976)
- Children: 3, including Sascha

John Harmon Rothchild (1945–2019) was an American freelance writer specializing in financial matters. He authored or co-authored more than a dozen books on finance and investing, and served as an editor of Washington Monthly as well as a columnist for Time and Fortune.

== Career ==
After serving in the Peace Corps in Ecuador, Rothchild began his career as a freelance writer at Washington Monthly. Rothchild's early writing had diverse subject, though he later focused primarily on finance. He published his first book, The Children of the Counterculture, with his wife, Susan Berns Wolf, in 1976. The book discussed the experiences of children raised in communes. In the 1980s, Rothchild started writing more about finance, publishing Stop Burning Your Money in 1981, followed by A Fool and His Money in 1988, and The Bear Book in 1988. Also in the 1980s, he published Up for Grabs, a book about his experiences in Florida.

In addition to The Children of the Counterculture, Rothchild co-authored several books. In 1990, he published Marjory Stoneman Douglas: Voice of the River with American journalist Marjory Stoneman Douglas. He also wrote several books with American investor Peter Lynch, including One Up on Wall Street (1989), Learn to Earn (1996), and Beating the Street (2003).

== Personal life ==
Rothchild was born in Norfolk, Virginia on May 13, 1945, then grew up in St. Petersburg, Florida. He graduated from high school in 1963, after which he earned a bachelor's degree in Latin American affairs from Yale University.

While working at the 1972 Democratic National Convention, Rothchild met Susan Berns, whom he married four years later. The couple had three children, including American writer Sascha Rothchild.

Rothchild died from complications related to Alzheimer's disease on December 27, 2019.

== Bibliography ==
- Rothchild, John; Wolf, Susan Berns (1976). The Children of the Counterculture: How the Life-Style of America's Flower Children Has Affected an Even Younger Generation. Garden City: Doubleday. ISBN 978-0-385-08220-4.
- Rothchild, John (1981). Stop Burning Your Money: The Intelligent Homeowner's Guide to Household Energy Savings. New York: Random House. ISBN 978-0-394-51366-9.
- Rothchild, John (1985). Up for Grabs: A Trip Through Time and Space in the Sunshine State. Viking. ISBN 978-0-670-74176-2.
- Rothchild, John (1988). A Fool and His Money: The Odyssey of an Average Investor. Wiley Investment Classics. ISBN 978-0-471-25138-5.
- Rothchild, John (1988). The Bear Book: Survive and Profit in Ferocious Markets. John Wiley & Sons. ISBN 978-0-471-19718-8.
- Lynch, Peter; Rothchild, John (1989). One Up On Wall Street: How to Use What You Already Know to Make Money in the Market. New York: Simon and Schuster. ISBN 978-0-671-66103-8.
- Douglas, Marjory Stoneman; Rothchild, John (1990). Marjory Stoneman Douglas: Voice of the River. Pineapple Press. ISBN 978-0-910923-94-1.
- Lynch, Peter; Rothchild, John (1997). Learn to Earn: A Beginner's Guide to the Basics of Investing and Business. John Wiley & Sons. ISBN 978-0-471-18003-6.
- Rothchild, John (2000). Going for Broke: How Robert Campeau Bankrupted the Retail Industry, Jolted the Junk Bond Market, and Brought the Booming 80s to a Crashing Halt. Beard Books. ISBN 978-1-893122-61-1.
- Lynch, Peter; Rothchild, John (2003). Beating the Street. Simon & Schuster. ISBN 978-0-671-75915-5.
- Rothchild, John (2003). The Davis Dynasty: Fifty Years of Successful Investing on Wall Street. John Wiley & Sons. ISBN 978-0-471-47441-8.
