= Peter Lynch =

American investor

- Born: January 19, 1944 (age 82); Newton, Massachusetts, U.S.
- Education: Boston College (BA); The Wharton School of the University of Pennsylvania (MBA)
- Occupations: Investor; author; mutual fund manager; philanthropist
- Employer: Fidelity Investments (1966–1990)
- Known for: Managing the Magellan Fund
- Notable work: Learn to Earn
- Title: Chairman of the Lynch Foundation
- Spouse: Carolyn Lynch (m. 1968; died 2015 to complications of leukemia)
- Children: 3

Peter Lynch (born January 19, 1944) is an American investor, mutual fund manager, author and philanthropist. As the manager of the Magellan Fund at Fidelity Investments between 1977 and 1990, Lynch averaged a 29.2% annual return, consistently outperforming S&P 500 stock market index and making it the best-performing mutual fund in the world. During his 13-year tenure, assets under management increased from US$18 million to $14 billion.

A proponent of value investing, Lynch wrote and co-authored a number of books and papers on investing strategies, including One Up on Wall Street, published by Simon & Schuster in 1989, which sold over one million copies. He coined a number of well-known mantras of modern individual investing, such as "invest in what you know" and "ten bagger". Lynch has been described as a "legend" by the financial media for his performance record.

== Early life and education ==
Peter Lynch was born on January 19, 1944, in Newton, Massachusetts. In 1951, when Lynch was seven, his father was diagnosed with brain cancer. He died three years later, and Lynch's mother had to work to support the family. Lynch reports that from his early teens he worked as a caddie to help support the family. During Lynch's time as a sophomore at Boston College, he used his savings to buy 100 shares of Flying Tiger Airlines at $7 per share. The stock would later rise to $80 per share, profits from which helped pay for his education.

In 1965, Lynch graduated from Boston College where he studied history, psychology, and philosophy. He later earned a Master of Business Administration from the Wharton School of the University of Pennsylvania in 1968.

== Investment career ==
=== Fidelity ===
In 1966, Lynch was hired as an intern with Fidelity Investments partly because he had been caddying for Fidelity's president, D. George Sullivan, (among others) at Brae Burn Country Club in Newton, Massachusetts. He initially covered the paper, chemical, and publishing industries, and when he returned after a two-year Army stint he was hired permanently in 1969. This time Lynch was charged with following the textiles, metals, mining, and chemicals industries, eventually becoming Fidelity's director of research from 1974 to 1977.

==== Fidelity Magellan Fund ====
In 1977, Lynch was named head of the then-obscure Magellan Fund which had $18 million in assets. By the time Lynch resigned as a fund manager in 1990, the fund had grown to more than $14 billion in assets with hundreds of stocks at the fund's largest. Joel Tillinghast, hired at Fidelity on Lynch's recommendation, later reported Lynch held so many hundreds of stocks in the fund because he felt it was "bad form" to stay in regular contact with a company but not hold the company's stock - so Lynch held lower-conviction stocks in very small percentages. From 1977 until 1990, the Magellan fund averaged a 29.2% annual return and as of 2003 had the best 20-year return of any mutual fund ever, as of 2017.

Taking over when Magellan was a small fund, Lynch had no restrictions imposed by Fidelity on what types of stocks he could buy, and was only limited by relevant laws or regulations under the Investment Company Act of 1940. He focused on individual companies he thought were good investments rather than any overarching strategy, starting with large US companies and gradually shifting his emphasis to smaller and international stocks. Lynch found successes in a broad range of stocks from different industries. According to Beating the Street his most profitable picks while running the Magellan fund were Fannie Mae ($500 million), Ford ($199 million), Philip Morris ($111 million), MCI ($92 million), Volvo ($79 million), General Electric ($76 million), General Public Utilities ($69 million), Student Loan Marketing ($65 million), Kemper ($63 million), and Lowe's ($54 million).

== Investment philosophy ==
Lynch has written (with co-author John Rothchild) three texts on investing: One Up on Wall Street (ISBN 0671661035), Beating the Street (ISBN 0671759159), and Learn to Earn. The last-named book was written for beginning investors of all ages, mainly teenagers. In essence, One Up served as theory while Beating the Street is application. One Up lays out Lynch's investment technique including chapters devoted to stock classifications, the two-minute drill, famous numbers, and designing a portfolio. Most of Beating the Street consists of an extensive stock by stock discussion of Lynch's 1992 Barron's Magazine selections, essentially providing an illustration of the concepts previously discussed. As such, both books represent study material for investors of any knowledge level or ability.

Lynch also wrote a series of investment articles for Worth magazine that expand on many of the concepts and companies mentioned in the books.

I’ve found that when the market’s going down and you buy funds wisely, at some point in the future you will be happy. You won’t get there by reading ‘Now is the time to buy.'

— Lynch on market movements

Lynch coined some of the best-known mantras of modern individual investing strategies.

His most famous investment principle is, "invest in what you know," popularizing the economic concept of "local knowledge". Since most people tend to become expert in certain fields, applying this basic "invest in what you know" principle helps individual investors find good undervalued stocks. Lynch uses this principle as a starting point for investors. He has also often said that the individual investor is potentially more capable of making money from stocks than a fund manager, because they are able to spot good investments in their day-to-day lives before Wall Street. Throughout his two classic investment primers, he has outlined many of the investments he found when not in his office. For example, in One Up Lynch explains how he invested in Dunkin' Donuts not after reading about the company in The Wall Street Journal, but after being impressed by their coffee as a customer. Assuming others would be similarly impressed and noting the company's Boston locations were always busy, he then studied the company's financial status and decided to invest in Dunkin' Donuts, which proved one of the best-performing stocks he ever bought. Lynch believes the individual investor is able to make similar smart investing choices noticing particular opportunities like Dunkin' Donuts or paying attention to business trends in their careers and hobbies. Using examples from Magellan Fund, his books outline how a novice should read and interpret company paperwork for information on stock valuation, earnings, cash flow, and other data.

Lynch has stated in One Up on Wall Street that his undergraduate studies in philosophy and logic were more important to his career than the math or finance he studied for his MBA. At Wharton, he came to believe that the two prevailing investing theories in academia, the random walk hypothesis and the efficient market hypothesis, were contradictory. The concepts taught by professors at school were regularly disproved by professionals during his internship at Fidelity. He thus came to rely more on practitioners than theoreticians: "It seemed to me that what was supposed to help you succeed in the investment business, could only help you fail ... Quantitative analysis taught me that the things I saw happening at Fidelity couldn't really be happening."

Lynch has also argued against market timing, stating: "Far more money has been lost by investors preparing for corrections or trying to anticipate corrections than has been lost in the corrections themselves."

Lynch popularized the stock investment strategy “GARP” (Growth At A Reasonable Price), which is a hybrid stock-picking approach that balances Growth investing potential for share-price increases with the discipline of Value investing to avoid buying overpriced stocks. Many well-known funds now follow the GARP model, ranging from equity funds such as Fidelity Investments Fidelity Contrafund (FCNTX) and Lemma Senbet Fund, to index funds such as Russell Indexes iShares Russell 1000 Growth Index.

He also coined the phrase "ten bagger" in a financial context. This refers to an investment which is worth ten times its original purchase price, and comes from baseball where the number of "bags" or "bases" that a batter can run to is a measure of the success of that runner's hit. A baseball player who hits a home run will pass all four bases, and so such a hit is sometimes called a four-bagger. Similarly, a baseball double hit is sometimes called a two bagger. As Lynch wrote in One Up on Wall Street, “In my business a fourbagger is nice, but a tenbagger is the fiscal equivalent of two home runs and a double.” In Beating the Street, Lynch expounded with many-bagger, "For the most part, the NAIC (National Association of Investors Corp) groups buy stocks in well-managed growth companies with a history of prosperity, and in which earnings are on the rise. This is the land of the many-bagger, where it’s not unusual to make 10, 20, or even 30 times your original investment in a decade.

Peter Lynch achieved above-average returns in part because, during his time as manager of the Fidelity Magellan Fund (1977–1990), he invested heavily in small-cap and mid-sized companies that were often overlooked by large institutional investors. His strategy of identifying many smaller and less noticed companies with growth potential contributed significantly to the average annual returns of approximately 29.2%, which significantly outperformed the broader market (S&P 500: 15.8%).

== Personal life ==
Lynch married Carolyn Ann Hoff and cofounded the Lynch Foundation. They had three daughters. His wife died in October 2015 due to complications of leukemia at age 69. He is a devout Catholic.

== Wealth and philanthropy ==
In 2006, Boston Magazine named Lynch in the top 50 wealthiest Bostonians ranking him 40th with an overall net worth of $352 million USD.

Though he continues to work part time as vice chairman of Fidelity Management & Research Co., the investment adviser arm of Fidelity Investments, spending most of his time mentoring young analysts, Peter Lynch focuses a great deal of time on philanthropy. He said he views philanthropy as a form of investment. He said he prefers to give money to support ideas that he thinks can spread, such as First Night, the New Year's Eve festival that began in Boston in 1976 and has inspired similar events in more than 200 other communities, and City Year, a community service program founded in Boston in 1988 that now operates in 29 cities across the U.S.

The Lynches give money primarily in five ways: as individuals, through the Lynch Foundation, through a Fidelity Charitable Gift Fund, and through two charitable trusts.

The Lynches have made gifts as individuals, donating $10 million to Peter Lynch's alma mater, Boston College. In turn, BC named the Lynch School of Education and Human Development after the family.

The Lynch Foundation, valued at $125 million, gave away $8 million in 2013 and has made $80 million in grants since its inception. The Foundation supports education, religious organizations, cultural and historic organizations, and hospitals and medical research. For example, the Foundation donated $20 million to establish in 2010 the Lynch Leadership Academy (LLA), a research and training program for school principals at BC's Carroll School of Management business school. The Lynch Foundation was one of the first major supporters of Teach for America, AmeriCares, and Partners in Health. Lynch was inducted into the Junior Achievement U.S. Business Hall of Fame in 1991.

Lynch is a member of the Harvard Medical School Board of Fellows.

== Honors ==
Lynch received the 1992 Seton Award from the National Catholic Education Association.

== Bibliography ==
- Lynch, Peter; Rothchild, John (2000) [1989]. One Up on Wall Street: How to Use What You Already Know to Make Money in the Market. Simon & Schuster (published April 3, 2000). p. 304. ISBN 9780743200400.
- Lynch, Peter; Rothchild, John (1994) [1993]. Beating the Street. Simon & Schuster (published May 25, 1994). p. 336. ISBN 9780671891633.
- Lynch, Peter; Rothchild, John (1996) [1995]. Learn to Earn: A Beginner's Guide to the Basics of Investing and Business. Simon & Schuster (published January 25, 1996). p. 272. ISBN 9780684811635.

== See also ==
- Gerald Tsai
- John Rothchild
- Phil Town
- Stock selection criterion
- William Danoff
- Fidelity Investments
- Value investing
- Beating the Street
- One Up on Wall Street
