= Fidelity Magellan Fund =

American mutual fund

The Fidelity Magellan Fund is a U.S.-domiciled mutual fund sponsored by Fidelity Investments. It also has an exchange-traded fund (ETF) wrapper, Fidelity Magellan ETF (CBOE: FMAG). As of September 2026, it had $36.7 billion in assets under management (AUM) and an expense ratio of 0.64%. It was notable for its 29.2% average annual return under the leadership of Peter Lynch from 1977 to 1990. Since the departure of Lynch, the fund has changed strategies and managers several times and has underperformed. In the 1990s, it was the largest mutual fund in the world, but it suffered a steep decline in assets after the bursting of the dot-com bubble and increasing popularity of index funds. The fund has been managed by Sammy Simnegar since December 2019.

== History ==
The fund launched on May 2, 1963. The first manager of the fund was Edward Johnson III, son of the founder of Fidelity, Edward C. Johnson II. Richard Habermann managed the fund from January 1972 to May 1977. Upon his departure in 1977, the fund had $20 million in AUM.

Peter Lynch was manager of the fund from 1977 to 1990. Between 1977 and 1990, Fidelity Magellan averaged a 29.2% annual return. Under Lynch, assets grew from $18 million to $14 billion. In 1989, Magellan held 1,400 stocks. The fund, which had been an exclusive fund of Fidelity founder Edward Johnson and his family, opened to the public in July 1981. Peter Lynch retired on May 31, 1990, age 46.

Morris Smith, who had successfully run Fidelity's Select Leisure Fund and Fidelity Over-the-Counter Fund, replaced Lynch as the manager of Magellan. He ran the fund from May 1990 to July 1992, producing an average annual return of 21.3% compared to an average 15.4% return for the S&P 500. AUM grew from $13 billion to $20 billion. Smith left voluntarily to spend time with his family and move to Israel.

From July 1992 to June 1996, the fund was managed by Jeffrey Vinik. Vinik controversially moved a large percentage of the fund's assets from technology stocks to bonds in 1995, just before the dot-com bubble led to outperformance of technology stocks. He also publicly made upbeat comments on the stock of Micron Technology while the fund was selling its shares, leading to an investigation by the United States Securities and Exchange Commission (SEC). Although the SEC brought no legal action, Fidelity was sued by shareholders for fraud and agreed to a $10 million settlement. During Vinik's tenure, the fund outperformed the S&P 500, although it significantly underperformed in his final year. Vinik quit Magellan after scrutiny and started a very successful hedge fund.

Robert E. Stansky, who was the research assistant of Peter Lynch from 1984 to 1987, managed the fund from June 1996 to November 2005. In September 1997, the fund was closed to new investors due to its size. Under Stansky's leadership, the fund sold its bonds and its portfolio more resembled the S&P 500. However, the fund was underweight technology stocks due to aversion after the dot-com bubble and the fund slightly underperformed the market during his tenure. In the last two years of his tenure, the fund underperformed the S&P 500 by 9 percentage points, leading to large outflows and the resignation of Stansky.

Harry Lange managed the fund from October 2005 to September 2011. Under his leadership, the fund's portfolio was broadened to include small-market capitalization and international stocks. In May 2006, the fund made a distribution of capital gains to shareholders representing 18.33% of fund assets. This reduced the fund's AUM further and had capital gains tax implications for shareholders. The distribution was due to the selling of assets by Lange. In January 2008, the fund was opened to new investors. Under Lange, AUM fell from $55 billion to $17 billion.

Jeffrey S. Feingold managed the fund beginning in September 2011. His returns were marginally better than those of the S&P 500. Redemptions continued as index funds became more popular. In February 2019, Sammy Simnegar became co-manager of the fund, and, at the end of 2019, he became the sole manager of the fund.

In February 2021, an ETF wrapper of the fund, Fidelity Magellan ETF, was launched.

== Financial performance ==
Year	Magellan	S&P 500	Difference
2025	+10.58%	+17.88%	−7.30%
2024	+28.03%	+25.02%	+3.01%
2023	+30.95%	+26.29%	+4.66%
2022	−27.15%	−18.11%	−9.04%
2021	+26.99%	+28.71%	−1.72%
2020	+28.34%	+18.40%	+9.94%
2019	+31.16%	+31.49%	−0.33%
2018	−5.60%	−4.38%	−1.22%
2017	+26.51%	+21.83%	+4.68%
2016	+5.24%	+11.96%	−6.72%
2015	+4.06%	+1.38%	+2.68%
2014	+14.08%	+13.69%	+0.39%
2013	+35.30%	+32.39%	+2.91%
2012	+17.99%	+16.00%	+1.99%
2011	−11.55%	+2.11%	−13.66%
2009	+41.13%	+26.46%	+14.67%
2008	−49.40%	−37.00%	−12.40%
2007	+18.83%	+5.49%	+13.34%
2006	+7.22%	+15.79%	−8.57%
2005	+6.42%	+4.91%	+1.51%
2004	+7.49%	+10.88%	−3.39%
2003	+24.82%	+28.68%	−3.86%
2002	−23.66%	−22.10%	−1.56%
2001	−11.65%	−11.89%	+0.24%
2000	−9.29%	−9.10%	−0.19%
1999	+24.05%	+21.04%	+3.01%
1998	+33.63%	+28.58%	+5.05%
1997	+26.59%	+33.36%	−6.77%
1996	+11.69%	+22.96%	−11.27%
1995	+36.82%	+37.58%	−0.76%
1994	−1.81%	+1.32%	−3.13%
1993	+24.66%	+10.08%	+14.58%
1992	+7.01%	+7.62%	−0.61%
1991	+41.03%	+30.47%	+10.56%
1990	−4.51%	−3.10%	−1.41%
1989	+34.58%	+31.69%	+2.89%
1988	+22.76%	+16.61%	+6.15%
1987	+1.00%	+5.25%	−4.25%
1986	+23.74%	+18.67%	+5.07%
1985	+43.11%	+31.73%	+11.38%
1984	+2.03%	+6.27%	−4.24%
1983	+38.59%	+22.56%	+16.03%
1982	+48.06%	+21.55%	+26.51%
1981	+16.45%	−4.92%	+21.37%
1980	+69.94%	+32.50%	+37.44%
1979	+51.73%	+18.61%	+33.12%
1978	+31.71%	+6.57%	+25.14%
1977	+14.46%	−7.16%	+21.62%
1976	+37.67%	+23.93%	+13.74%
1975	+44.55%	+37.23%	+7.32%
1974	−28.47%	−26.47%	−2.00%
1973	−42.18%	−14.69%	−27.49%
1972	+30.05%	+19.00%	+11.05%
1971	+35.14%	+14.30%	+20.84%
1970	−15.75%	+3.86%	−19.61%

Manager	Tenure	AUM at end of tenure
Edward Johnson, III	1963 to December 1971	$20 million
Richard Habermann	January 1972 to May 1977	$18 million
Peter Lynch	May 1977 to May 1990	$14 billion
Morris J. Smith	May 1990 to July 1992	$20 billion
Jeffrey Vinik	July 1992 to June 1996	$50 billion
Robert E. Stansky	June 1996 to October 2005	$52.5 billion
Harry W. Lange	October 2005 to September 2011	$14.7 billion
Jeffrey S. Feingold	September 2011 to December 2019	$21.0 billion
Sammy Simnegar	January 2020 to present	Not applicable
