= Fidelity Investments =

American multinational financial services firm

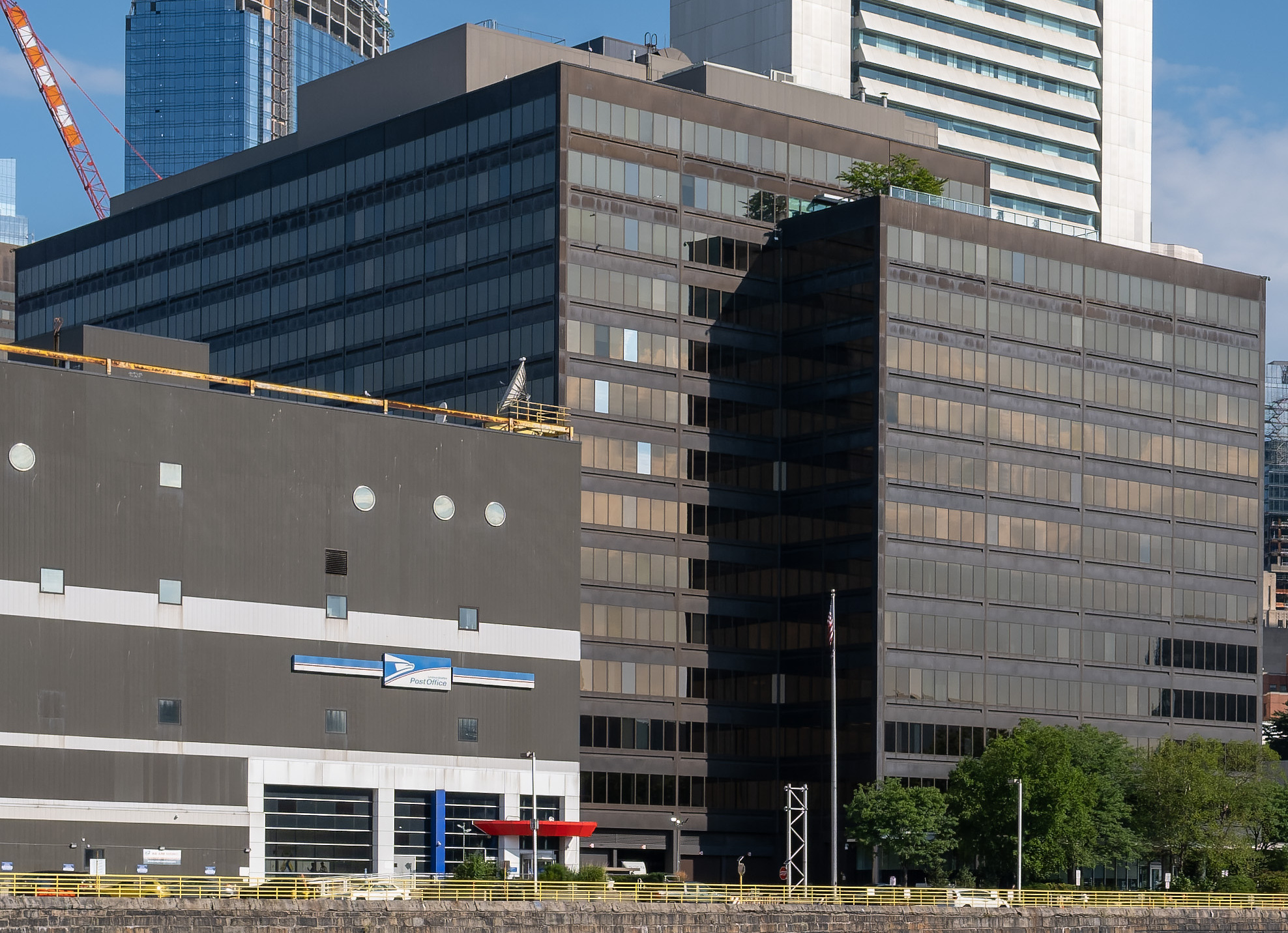
- Headquarters at 245 Summer Street in Boston
- Formerly: Fidelity Management and Research Company
- Type: Private
- Industry: Financial services
- Founded: 1946; 80 years ago
- Founder: Edward C. Johnson II
- Headquarters: Boston, Massachusetts, United States
- Area served: Worldwide
- Key people: Abigail Johnson (CEO)
- Products: Annuities; Mutual funds; Exchange-traded funds; Index funds; IRAs; 401(k)s; 529 plans; Investment funds; Retirement planning and advice; Life insurance; Transaction accounts; Credit cards
- Services: Investment management; Asset management; Risk management; Stockbroker; Financial planners; Wealth management; Retirement planning and advice
- Revenue: ▲US$37.7 billion (2025)
- Operating income: ▲US$12.7 billion (2025)
- AUM: ▲US$7.1 trillion (2025)
- Owners: FMR LLC; Abigail Johnson and family (roughly 40%); Current and former employees (roughly 60%)
- Number of employees: 80,000 (2025)
- Website: fidelity.com

Fidelity Investments, formerly known as Fidelity Management & Research (FMR), is an American financial services company. The company is one of the largest asset managers in the world, with $7.8 trillion in assets under management, and $19.9 trillion in assets under administration, as of June 2026.

Fidelity operates a brokerage firm; manages mutual funds and exchange-traded funds; offers wealth management; and provides fund distribution, retirement services, securities execution and clearance, asset custody, and life insurance. Fidelity also offers cryptocurrency investing and has its own stablecoin, the Fidelity Digital Dollar (FIDD) on the Ethereum network. It also offers a donor-advised fund, Fidelity Charitable, for clients seeking to donate securities. It processes 5.7 million daily average trades and is one of the largest providers of 401(k) plans and manages employee benefit programs for more than 28,800 businesses. It also offers brokerage clearing software products for financial services firms.

Abigail Johnson, granddaughter of founder Edward C. Johnson II, and her family and their affiliates own a roughly 40% interest in the company. The remainder is owned by current and former executives.

== History ==
The Fidelity Fund incorporated in Massachusetts on May 1, 1930, with Edward C. Johnson II serving as president. The corporate structure changed in 1946 and became known as Fidelity Management & Research (FMR).

In 1969, the company formed Fidelity International (FIL) to serve non-U.S. markets and subsequently spun it off in 1980 into an independent entity owned by its employees.

In 1982, the company began offering 401(k) products, followed by computerized stock trading offerings in 1984.

In the 1990s, Fidelity launched its first commercial donor-advised fund, became the first mutual fund company to offer a webpage, and appointed Robert Pozen as CEO.

In September 2003, the company launched its first exchange-traded fund, the Fidelity Nasdaq Composite Index Tracking Stock Fund (ONEQ). The company acquired Wealth Lab the following year, which was laterdecommissioned in 2020.

In 2007, the company changed its legal structure to a limited liability company, with FMR LLC becoming the owning entity. Fidelity Ventures, its venture capital arm, was shut down in 2010.

In 2014, Abigail Johnson became president and CEO of Fidelity Investments (FMR) as well as chairman of Fidelity International (FIL). She reduced dependence on open-ended mutual funds, instead having the company focus on financial advice, brokerage services, and venture capital.

In August 2018, Fidelity introduced mutual funds with no fees or expense ratios.

In September 2019, Fidelity completed the corporate spin-off of Eight Roads Ventures, its venture capital division.

In January 2023, Fidelity acquired Shoobx, a provider of automated equity management operations and financing software which was folded into Fidelity’s Stock Plan Services business.

== Investments on behalf of management ==
The company also makes investments on its own account for the benefit of the founding family and its executives. Investments have included Seaport Center and 2.5 million square feet of office space in Boston; COLT Telecom Group; MetroRed; Community Newspaper Company; Lanoga; Hope Lumber; ProBuild; and Boston Coach. In 2016, an investigation by Reuters showed that Fidelity executives made investments in shares at a fraction of the price later paid by funds managed by Fidelity Investments; examples included buying shares in Alibaba Group for 7 cents each. Later purchases of shares by funds managed by Fidelity was seen as propping up the values of the shares owned by the founders, a possible conflict of interest.

== Legal and regulatory issues ==
=== Document retention fines ===
In February 2007, the NASD, a division of the Financial Industry Regulatory Authority, fined four FMR-affiliated broker-dealers $3.75 million for alleged registration, supervision and e-mail retention violations. The broker-dealers settled without admitting or denying the charges.

In 2004, Fidelity Brokerage paid $2 million to settle charges by the U.S. Securities and Exchange Commission that employees altered and destroyed documents in 21 of its 88 branch offices between January 2001 and July 2002. Fidelity has internal inspections every year to make sure it is complying with federal regulations. Management was accused of pressuring branch employees to have perfect inspections and gave notice of the inspections and that at least 62 employees destroyed or altered potentially improper documents maintained at branch offices including new account applications, letters of authorization and variable annuity forms.

=== Misrepresentations ===
In May 2007, NASD fined two Fidelity broker-dealers $400,000 for preparing and distributing misleading sales literature promoting Fidelity's Destiny I and II Systematic Investment Plans, which were sold primarily to U.S. military personnel. As part of the settlement, the FMR affiliates were required to notify Destiny Plan holders that additional shares of the underlying fund can be purchased without paying additional sales charges.

=== Employee stealing from clients ===
In January 2025, the company was fined $600,000 by the Financial Industry Regulatory Authority for lax supervision after an employee stole $750,000 from the accounts of 37 international clients over an eight year period from 2012 to 2020.

=== Tardy processing ===
In May 2025, the company was fined and censured by federal regulators for taking weeks to complete certain customer transactions that should have taken days.

=== Accepting gifts from brokerages ===
In December 2006, the company was fined $42 million after some employees accepted gifts from salespeople of Jefferies Group in violation of the company's policies. The firm was fined an additional $3.75 million in February 2007 and $8 million in 2008. Gifts included private chartered flights, tickets to the 2004 Super Bowl, Wimbledon Championships and the US Open tennis tournament; tickets to Justin Timberlake, U2, and Christina Aguilera concerts; and high-end wines such as 1993 Château Pétrus.

== Finances ==
| Year | 2016 | 2017 | 2018 | 2019 | 2020 | 2021 | 2022 | 2023 | 2024 | 2025 |
|---|---|---|---|---|---|---|---|---|---|---|
| Revenue (US$ billions) | 15.9 | 18.3 | 20.4 | 20.9 | 21.0 | 24.0 | 25.2 | 28.2 | 32.7 | 37.7 |
| Operating income (US$ billions) | 3.5 | 5.3 | 6.3 | 6.9 | 7.2 | 8.1 | 8.0 | 8.5 | 10.3 | 12.7 |
| Assets under management (US$ trillions) | 2.13 | 2.45 | 2.42 | 3.2 | 3.8 | 4.5 | 3.9 | 4.9 | 5.9 | 7.1 |
| Assets under administration (US$ trillions) | 5.70 | 6.80 | 6.69 | 8.3 | 9.8 | 11.8 | 10.3 | 12.6 | 15.1 | 18.0 |
| References | | | | | | | | | | |

== See also ==
- List of mutual funds in the United States by assets under management
- List of electronic trading platforms

=== Notable mutual funds offered by Fidelity Investments ===
- Fidelity Contrafund
- Fidelity Magellan Fund
