= Investment management =

Professional asset management of securities for the benefit of investors

Investment management (sometimes referred to more generally as financial asset management) is the professional asset management of various securities, including shareholdings, bonds, and other assets, such as real estate, to meet specified investment goals for the benefit of investors. Investors may be institutions, such as insurance companies, pension funds, corporations, charities, educational establishments, or private investors, either directly via investment contracts/mandates or via collective investment schemes like mutual funds, exchange-traded funds, or Real estate investment trusts.

The term investment management is often used to refer to the management of investment funds, most often specializing in private and public equity, real assets, alternative assets, and/or bonds. The more generic term asset management may refer to management of assets not necessarily primarily held for investment purposes.

Professionals working in investment management commonly hold undergraduate degrees in fields such as finance, mathematics, or accounting, and may also obtain advanced degrees or professional certifications. Their services can include advising clients on financial planning and investment strategies, including services associated with wealth management for high-net-worth individuals. Certain investment management activities in the United States are regulated by authorities such as the U.S. Securities and Exchange Commission. Investment professionals may also obtain industry certifications, including the Chartered Financial Analyst (CFA) designation.

Fund managers, or investment advisers in the United States, are generally considered fiduciaries and are required to act in the best interests of their clients.

== Amount available for investment ==
Modern portfolio theory suggests a diversified portfolio of shares and other asset classes (such as debt in corporate bonds, treasury bonds, or money market funds) will realise more predictable returns if there is prudent market regulation.

The amount available for investing oblige to use different type of investment and my not allow yet to reach directly an Investment manager .

Most investment management clients can be classified as either institutional or retail/advisory, depending on if the client is an institution or private individual/family trust. Investment managers who specialize in advisory or discretionary management on behalf of (normally wealthy) private investors may often refer to their services as money management or portfolio management within the context of "private banking". Wealth management by financial advisors takes a more holistic view of a client, with allocations to particular asset management strategies.

The term fund manager, or investment adviser in the United States, refers to both a firm that provides investment management services and to the individual who directs fund management decisions.

The five largest asset managers are holding 22.7 percent of the externally held assets. Nevertheless, the market concentration, measured via the Herfindahl-Hirschmann Index, could be estimated at 173.4 in 2018, showing that the industry is not very concentrated.

== Industry scope ==
The business of investment has several facets, the employment of professional fund managers, research (of individual assets and asset classes), dealing, settlement, marketing, internal auditing, and the preparation of reports for clients. The largest financial fund managers are firms that exhibit all the complexity their size demands. Apart from the people who bring in the money (marketers) and the people who direct investment (the fund managers), there are compliance staff (to ensure accord with legislative and regulatory constraints), internal auditors of various kinds (to examine internal systems and controls), financial controllers (to account for the institutions' own money and costs), computer experts, and "back office" employees (to track and record transactions and fund valuations for up to thousands of clients per institution).

=== Key problems of running such businesses ===
Key problems include:

- Revenue is directly linked to market valuations, so a major fall in asset prices can cause a precipitous decline in revenues relative to costs.
- Above-average fund performance is difficult to sustain, and clients may not be patient during times of poor performance.
- Successful fund managers are expensive and may be headhunted by competitors.
- Above-average fund performance appears to be dependent on the unique skills of the fund manager; however, clients are often reluctant to stake their investments on the ability of a few individuals- they would rather see firm-wide success, attributable to a single philosophy and internal discipline.
- Analysts who generate above-average returns often become sufficiently wealthy that they avoid corporate employment in favor of managing their personal portfolios.

=== Representing the owners of shares ===
Institutions often control huge shareholdings. In most cases, they are acting as fiduciary agents rather than principals (direct owners). The owners of shares theoretically have great power to alter the companies via the voting rights the shares carry and the consequent ability to pressure managements, and if necessary out-vote them at annual and other meetings.

In practice, the ultimate owners of shares often do not exercise the power they collectively hold (because the owners are many, each with small holdings); financial institutions (as agents) sometimes do. Institutional shareholders should exercise more active influence over the companies in which they hold shares (e.g., to hold managers to account, to ensure Board's effective functioning). Such action would add a pressure group to those (the regulators and the Board) overseeing management.

However, there is the problem of how the institution should exercise this power. One way is for the institution to decide; another is for it to poll its beneficiaries. Assuming that the institution chooses to poll, should it then:

(i) Vote the entire holding as directed by the majority of votes cast?

(ii) Split the vote (where this is allowed) according to the proportions of the vote?

(iii) Or respect the abstainers and only vote the respondents' holdings?

The price signals generated by large active managers holding or not holding the stock may contribute to management change. For example, this is the case when a large active manager sells his position in a company, leading to (possibly) a decline in the stock price, but more importantly a loss of confidence by the markets in the management of the company, thus precipitating changes in the management team.

Some institutions have been more vocal and active in pursuing such matters; for instance, some firms believe that there are investment advantages to accumulating substantial minority shareholdings (i.e. 10% or more) and putting pressure on management to implement significant changes in the business. In some cases, institutions with minority holdings work together to force management change. Perhaps more frequent is the sustained pressure that large institutions bring to bear on management teams through persuasive discourse and PR. On the other hand, some of the largest investment managers—such as BlackRock, Aladdin and Vanguard—advocate simply owning every company, reducing the incentive to influence management teams. A reason for this last strategy is that the investment manager prefers a closer, more open, and honest relationship with a company's management team than would exist if they exercised control; allowing them to make a better investment decision.

The national context in which shareholder representation considerations are set is variable and important. The USA is a litigious society and shareholders use the law as a lever to pressure management teams. In Japan, it is traditional for shareholders to be below in the 'pecking order', which often allows management and labor to ignore the rights of the ultimate owners. Whereas US firms generally cater to shareholders, Japanese businesses generally exhibit a stakeholder mentality, in which they seek consensus amongst all interested parties (against a background of strong unions and labor legislation).

== Size of the global fund management industry ==
Conventional assets under management of the global fund management industry increased by 10% in 2010, to $79.3 trillion. Pension assets accounted for $29.9 trillion of the total, with $24.7 trillion invested in mutual funds and $24.6 trillion in insurance funds. Together with alternative assets (sovereign wealth funds, hedge funds, private equity funds, and exchange-traded funds) and funds of wealthy individuals, assets of the global fund management industry totalled around $117 trillion. Growth in 2010 followed a 14% increase in the previous year and was due both to the recovery in equity markets during the year and an inflow of new funds.

As of 2011 the US remained by far the biggest source of funds, accounting for around a half of conventional assets under management or some $36 trillion. The UK was the second-largest centre in the world and by far the largest in Europe with around 8% of the global total.

== Philosophy, process, and people ==
The 3-P's (Philosophy, Process, and People) are often used to describe the reasons why the manager can produce above-average results.

- Philosophy refers to the overarching beliefs of the investment organization. For example: (i) Does the manager buy growth or value shares, or a combination of the two (and why)? (ii) Do they believe in market timing (and on what evidence)? (iii) Do they rely on external research or do they employ a team of researchers? It is helpful if all of such fundamental beliefs are supported by proof-statements.
- Process refers to how the overall philosophy is implemented. For example: (i) Which universe of assets is explored before particular assets are chosen as suitable investments? (ii) How does the manager decide what to buy and when? (iii) How does the manager decide what to sell and when? (iv) Who takes the decisions and are they taken by committee? (v) What controls are in place to ensure that a rogue fund (one very different from others and from what is intended) cannot arise?
- People refer to the staff, especially the fund managers. Questions include who they are, how they are selected, how old they are, and how responsibilities are distributed within the team. This last question is vital because whatever performance record was presented at the outset of the relationship with the client may or may not relate to (have been produced by) a team that is still in place. If the team has changed greatly (high staff turnover or changes to the team), then arguably the performance record is completely unrelated to the existing team (of fund managers).

=== Ethical principles ===
Ethical or religious principles may be used to determine or guide the way in which money is invested. Christians tend to follow the Biblical scripture. Several religions follow Mosaic law which proscribed the charging of interest. The Quakers forbade involvement in the slave trade and so started the concept of ethical investment.

== Regulations ==
Investment management globally is subject to various regulatory requirements aimed at protecting investors and ensuring ethical and professional conduct by investment management firms and professionals. Investment managers and firms are entrusted with the financial assets of clients and are obligated to act in the best interests of their clients, prioritizing the clients' interests ahead of their own. This involves seeking the best investment strategy based on due diligence in understanding the clients' goals, objectives, risk constraints, and needs, as well as providing full and fair disclosure of expected risks, benefits, fees, and conflicts of interest.

=== United States ===
In the United States, investment management is regulated primarily by the U.S. Securities and Exchange Commission (SEC), which develops and enforces rules governing investment advisers and related market participants. Under U.S. law, investment advisers with assets under management (AUM) exceeding $110 million generally register with the SEC, while advisers managing smaller amounts typically register with state regulatory authorities.

Certain exemptions exist for specific categories of advisers, including those advising solely venture capital funds, family offices, or private funds with less than $150 million in assets under management. The regulatory framework for investment management in the United States includes disclosure requirements, professional conduct standards, and oversight by regulatory authorities.

Two key statutes governing the industry are the Investment Advisers Act of 1940 and the Investment Company Act of 1940, which established federal regulation of investment advisers, investment companies, and related activities.

=== United Kingdom ===
In the United Kingdom, investment management is regulated primarily by the Financial Conduct Authority (FCA), which is responsible for authorizing and supervising investment managers and certain investment fund vehicles. Firms engaging in regulated activities, such as advising clients on investments, managing investments, or dealing in investments as an agent on behalf of clients, are generally required to obtain FCA authorization.

The regulatory framework also covers areas including conduct of business, financial reporting, compliance, and complaints handling. Certain investment funds are additionally subject to oversight under the Alternative Investment Fund Managers Directive (AIFMD), which governs aspects of fund management and marketing within the European Union.

=== Asian countries ===
Regulatory frameworks for investment management vary across Asia, reflecting differences in national financial regulation systems. In Japan, aspects of financial markets and related services are supervised by the Financial Services Agency (FSA). The agency oversees a range of financial activities, including certain regulations related to cryptocurrency and payment services.

Regulation of cryptocurrencies and related financial services varies across other Asian countries, with differing legal frameworks and regulatory approaches. In Southeast Asia, including member states of the Association of Southeast Asian Nations (ASEAN), economic integration and investment policies have been analyzed in relation to their potential to attract international investment and encourage policy coordination among countries in the region.

== Investment managers and portfolio structures ==
At the heart of the investment management industry are the managers who invest and divest clients' investments.

A certified company investment advisor should conduct an assessment of each client's individual needs and risk profile. The advisor then recommends appropriate investments.

=== Asset allocation ===
The different asset class definitions are widely debated, but four common divisions are cash and fixed income (such as certificates of deposit), stocks, bonds and real estate. The exercise of allocating funds among these assets (and among individual securities within each asset class) is what investment management firms are paid for. Asset classes exhibit different market dynamics, and different interaction effects; thus, the allocation of money among asset classes will have a significant effect on the performance of the fund. Some research suggests that allocation among asset classes has more predictive power than the choice of individual holdings in determining portfolio return. Arguably, the skill of a successful investment manager resides in constructing the asset allocation, and separating individual holdings, to outperform certain benchmarks (e.g., the peer group of competing funds, bonds, and stock indices).

=== Long-term returns ===
It is important to look at the evidence on the long-term returns to different assets, and to holding period returns (the returns that accrue on average over different lengths of investment). For example, over very long holding periods (e.g. 10+ years) in most countries, equities have generated higher returns than bonds, and bonds have generated higher returns than cash. According to financial theory, this is because equities are riskier (more volatile) than bonds which are themselves riskier than cash.

=== Diversification ===
Against the background of the asset allocation, fund managers consider the degree of diversification that makes sense for a given client (given its risk preferences) and construct a list of planned holdings accordingly. The list will indicate what percentage of the fund should be invested in each particular stock or bond. The theory of portfolio diversification was originated by Markowitz (and many others). Effective diversification requires management of the correlation between the asset returns and the liability returns, issues internal to the portfolio (individual holdings volatility), and cross-correlations between the returns.

== Investment styles ==
There is a range of different styles of fund management that the institution can implement. For example, growth, value, growth at a reasonable price (GARP), market neutral, small capitalisation, indexed, etc. Each of these approaches has its distinctive features, adherents, and in any particular financial environment, distinctive risk characteristics. For example, there is evidence that growth styles (buying rapidly growing earnings) are especially effective when the companies able to generate such growth are scarce; conversely, when such growth is plentiful, then there is evidence that value styles tend to outperform the indices particularly successfully.

Large asset managers are increasingly profiling their equity portfolio managers to execute trades more effectively. While this strategy is less effective for small-cap trades, it has proven effective for portfolios with large-cap companies.

== Performance measurement ==
Fund performance is often thought to be the acid test of fund management, and in the institutional context, accurate measurement is a necessity. For that purpose, institutions measure the performance of each fund (and usually for internal purposes components of each fund) under their management, and performance is also measured by external firms that specialize in performance measurement. The leading performance measurement firms (e.g. Russell Investment Group in the US or BI-SAM in Europe) compile aggregate industry data, e.g., showing how funds in general performed against given performance indices and peer groups over various periods.

In a typical case (let us say an equity fund), the calculation would be made (as far as the client is concerned) every quarter and would show a percentage change compared with the prior quarter (e.g., +4.6% total return in US dollars). This figure would be compared with other similar funds managed within the institution (for purposes of monitoring internal controls), with performance data for peer group funds, and with relevant indices (where available) or tailor-made performance benchmarks where appropriate. The specialist performance measurement firms calculate quartile and decile data and close attention would be paid to the (percentile) ranking of any fund.

It is probably appropriate for an investment firm to persuade its clients to assess performance over longer periods (e.g., 3 to 5 years) to smooth out very short-term fluctuations in performance and the influence of the business cycle. This can be difficult however and, industry-wide, there is a serious preoccupation with short-term numbers and the effect on the relationship with clients (and resultant business risks for the institutions). One effective solution to this problem is to include a minimum evaluation period in the investment management agreement, whereby the minimum evaluation period equals the investment manager's investment horizon.

An enduring problem is whether to measure before-tax or after-tax performance. After-tax measurement represents the benefit to the investor, but investors' tax positions may vary. Before-tax measurement can be misleading, especially in regimens that tax realised capital gains (and not unrealised). It is thus possible that successful active managers (measured before tax) may produce miserable after-tax results. One possible solution is to report the after-tax position of some standard taxpayer.

=== Risk-adjusted performance measurement ===
Performance measurement should not be reduced to the evaluation of fund returns alone, but must also integrate other fund elements that would be of interest to investors, such as the measure of risk taken. Several other aspects are also part of performance measurement: evaluating if managers have succeeded in reaching their objective, i.e. if their return was sufficiently high to reward the risks taken; how they compare to their peers; and finally, whether the portfolio management results were due to luck or the manager's skill. The need to answer all these questions has led to the development of more sophisticated performance measures, many of which originate in modern portfolio theory. Modern portfolio theory established the quantitative link that exists between portfolio risk and returns. The capital asset pricing model (CAPM) developed by Sharpe (1964) highlighted the notion of rewarding risk and produced the first performance indicators, be they risk-adjusted ratios (Sharpe ratio, information ratio) or differential returns compared to benchmarks (alphas). The Sharpe ratio is the simplest and best-known performance measure. It measures the return of a portfolio over above the risk-free rate, compared to the total risk of the portfolio. This measure is said to be absolute, as it does not refer to any benchmark, avoiding drawbacks related to a poor choice of benchmark. Meanwhile, it does not allow the separation of the performance of the market in which the portfolio is invested from that of the manager. The information ratio is a more general form of the Sharpe ratio in which the risk-free asset is replaced by a benchmark portfolio. This measure is relative, as it evaluates portfolio performance about a benchmark, making the result strongly dependent on this benchmark choice.

Portfolio alpha is obtained by measuring the difference between the return of the portfolio and that of a benchmark portfolio. This measure appears to be the only reliable performance measure to evaluate active management. we have to distinguish between normal returns, provided by the fair reward for portfolio exposure to different risks, and obtained through passive management, from abnormal performance (or outperformance) due to the manager's skill (or luck), whether through market timing, stock picking, or good fortune. The first component is related to allocation and style investment choices, which may not be under the sole control of the manager, and depends on the economic context, while the second component is an evaluation of the success of the manager's decisions. Only the latter, measured by alpha, allows the evaluation of the manager's true performance (but then, only if you assume that any outperformance is due to the skill and not luck).

Portfolio returns may be evaluated using factor models. The first model, proposed by Jensen (1968), relies on the CAPM and explains portfolio returns with the market index as the only factor. It quickly becomes clear, however, that one factor is not enough to explain the returns very well and that other factors have to be considered. Multi-factor models were developed as an alternative to the CAPM, allowing a better description of portfolio risks and a more accurate evaluation of a portfolio's performance. For example, Fama and French (1993) have highlighted two important factors that characterize a company's risk in addition to market risk. These factors are the book-to-market ratio and the company's size as measured by its market capitalization. Fama and French-, therefore proposed a three-factor model to describe portfolio normal returns (Fama–French three-factor model). Carhart (1997) proposed adding momentum as a fourth factor to allow the short-term persistence of returns to be taken into account. Also of interest for performance measurement is Sharpe's (1992) style analysis model, in which factors are style indices. This model allows a custom benchmark for each portfolio to be developed, using the linear combination of style indices that best replicate portfolio style allocation, and leads to an accurate evaluation of portfolio alpha. However, certain research indicates that internet data may not necessarily enhance the precision of predictive models.

== Education or certification ==
Investment management certifications
- Chartered Alternative Investment Analyst (CAIA)
- Chartered Financial Analyst (CFA)
- Chartered Investment Manager (CIM)
- Chartered Wealth Manager (CWM)
- Certified International Investment Analyst (CIIA)

At the undergraduate level, several business schools and universities internationally offer "Investments" as a subject within their degree; further, some universities, in fact, confer a specialist bachelor's degree, with title in "Investment Management" or in "Asset Management" or in "Financial Markets".

Increasingly, those with aspirations to work as an investment manager, require further education beyond a bachelor's degree in business, finance, or economics.

- Designations such as the Chartered Financial Analyst (CFA), internationally, or the more local Chartered Investment Manager (CIM) in Canada, and the Certified International Investment Analyst (CIIA) in Europe and Asia, are increasingly required for advancement; even to gain entry-level positions in the industry, enrollment / partial completion of exams is often helpful.
- Further, a graduate degree - typically the MBA or MSF, or the more specialized Masters in Investment Management – may also be required for advancement to senior roles; and lately for entry-level roles.

There is much discussion as to the various factors that can affect the performance of an investment manager, including the manager's qualifications. Some conclude that there is no evidence that any particular qualification enhances the manager's ability to select investments that result in above-average returns. But see also Chartered Financial Analyst § Efficacy of the CFA program re related research.

== Money management ==
Money management is the process of expense tracking, investing, budgeting, banking and evaluating taxes of one's money, which includes investment management and wealth management.

Money management is a strategic technique to make money yield the highest interest-output value for any amount spent. Spending money to satisfy cravings (regardless of whether they can justifiably be included in a budget) is a natural human phenomenon.

The idea of money management techniques has been developed to reduce the amount that individuals, firms, and institutions spend on items that add no significant value to their living standards, long-term portfolios, and assets. Warren Buffett, in one of his documentaries, admonished prospective investors to embrace his highly esteemed "frugality" ideology. This involves making every financial transaction worth the expense:

1. avoid any expense that appeals to vanity or snobbery
2. always go for the most cost-effective alternative (establishing small quality-variance benchmarks, if any)
3. favor expenditures on interest-bearing items over all others
4. establish the expected benefits of every desired expenditure using the canon of plus/minus/nil to the standard of living value system.

These techniques are investment-boosting and portfolio-multiplying. There are certain companies as well that offer services, provide counseling and different models for managing money. These are designed to manage grace assets and make them grow.

=== Comparison to wealth management ===
Wealth management, where financial advisors perform financial planning for clients, has traditionally served as an intermediary to investment managers in the United States and less so in Europe. However, as of 2019, the lines were becoming blurred.

=== Trading and investment ===
Money management is used in investment management and deals with the question of how much risk a decision maker should take in situations where uncertainty is present. More precisely what percentage or what part of the decision maker's wealth should be put into risk in order to maximize the decision maker's utility function.

Money management can mean gaining greater control over outgoings and incomings, both from a personal and a business perspective. Better money management can be achieved by establishing budgets and analyzing costs and income.

In stock and futures trading, money management plays an important role in every success of a trading system. This is closely related with trading expectancy:

"Expectancy" which is the average amount you can expect to win or lose per dollar at risk. Mathematically:

Expectancy = (Trading system Winning probability * Average Win) – (Trading system losing probability * Average Loss)

So for example even if a trading system has 60% losing probability and only 40% winning of all trades, using money management a trader can set his average win substantially higher compared to his average loss in order to produce a profitable trading system. If he set his average win at around $400 per trade (this can be done using proper exit strategy) and managing/limiting the losses to around $100 per trade; the expectancy is around:

Expectancy = (Trading system Winning probability * Average Win) – (Trading system losing probability * Average Loss)

Expectancy = (0.4 x 400) - (0.6 x 100)=$160 - $60 = $100 net average profit per trade (of course commissions are not included in the computations).

Therefore, the key to successful money management is maximizing every winning trades and minimizing losses (regardless whether you have a winning or losing trading system, such as %Loss probability > %Win probability).

== See also ==
- Active management
- Alpha capture system
- Asset management company
- Chief investment officer
- Corporate governance
- Discretionary investment management
- Exchange fund
- Exchange-traded fund
- Financial economics § Portfolio theory
- Factor investing
- Financial management
- Financial risk management § Investment management
- Fund governance
- Investment
- Investment style
- List of asset management firms
- Low-volatility investing
- Managed account
- Momentum investing
- Passive management
- Pension fund
- Performance attribution
- Portfolio
- Private equity
- Quantitative investing
- Securities lending
- Separately managed account
- Sovereign Wealth Fund
- Stockbroker
- Style investing
  - Style drift
  - Returns-based style analysis
- Tracking error
- Transition management
- Value investing
- Outline of finance § Portfolio theory
- Outline of management
