= Style investing =

Investment approach

Style investing is an investment approach in which securities are grouped into categories, and portfolio allocation is based on selection among "styles" rather than among individual securities.

Style investors, then, make portfolio allocation decisions by placing their money in broad categorizations of assets, such as small-cap, value, low-volatility, or emerging markets. Some investors dynamically allocate across different styles and move funds back and forth between these styles depending on their expected performance.

Styles enable institutional investors to organize and simplify their portfolio allocation decisions, as well as to measure and evaluate the performance of professional managers relative to standardized style benchmarks (see style drift). An implication of style investing is that it could impact financial markets, causing stocks to move together.

== Asset pricing ==
Style investing can be used in the study of asset prices and can serve as a useful framework for identifying anomalous price movements in stocks, and to then study the relation between risk and return in asset pricing models. See Returns-based style analysis.

As above, style investing generates co-movement between individual assets and their styles. Momentum and reversal patterns exist both at style level and security level and style investing plays an important role in the predictability of returns.

Barberis and Shleifer present a model where investors allocate funds based on the relative performance of investment styles which explains style momentum: "if an asset performed well last period, there is a good chance that the outperformance was due to the asset’s being a member of a “hot” style...If so, the style is likely to keep attracting inflows from switchers next period, making it likely that the asset itself also does well next period”.

Style investing can also lead to mispricing: when a security is re-classified, such as when a stock is added to the S&P 500 index, its co-movement with the index increases while its co-movement with stocks outside of the index declines and possibly hurting performance.

== Classification ==
When classifying securities into styles, investors group together assets that appear to be similar, in the sense that they have a common characteristic. (Styles may then overlap asset classes.) A characteristic can be an obvious one such as the country in which the security is traded, or the industry in which the firm operates. Other characteristics used as the basis for a style are based on size, risk, valuation, price return, or profitability. Value investing is well-known and emerged as a distinctive equity style following the work of Graham and Dodd (1934).

Stocks can be split into categories such as small-cap, mid-cap, large-cap, value, defensive, cyclical, growth, international, regional, technology stocks, utility stocks, old economy or new economy, disruptive innovation, and so on. Classification of securities into categories is widespread in the financial field applying to other asset classes also. Bonds are split into high-yield bonds and investment grade bonds and short-duration and long-duration bonds. Traders classify assets as liquid securities such as private equity and public equity. They may also do the same with illiquid securities, such as private debt, illiquid hedge funds, direct real estate and venture capital.

== Financial industry ==
Financial firms Lipper and Morningstar developed and refined categorization systems and Style Box tools to aid with classification in the 1970s and 1990s. Also major index providers such as MSCI and FTSE offer a wide range of style-based indices. Also many asset managers offer style-based active strategies, sometimes also referred to as factor investing.

== See also ==
- Style drift
- Returns-based style analysis
- Low-volatility investing
- Sector rotation
- Size premium
- Value investing
- Financial risk management § Investment management
