= Factor investing =

Investment approach in stock returns

Factor investing is an investment approach that targets measurable characteristics of securities, known as factors, which help explain differences in risk and return. Commonly studied equity factors include size, value, momentum, quality, and low volatility. Other characteristics sometimes used in factor-based strategies include asset growth, leverage, term, carry, and liquidity.

A factor-based investment strategy typically involves tilting portfolios toward or away from these characteristics in an attempt to capture long-term return premia or reduce downside risk. This can be implemented through quantitative active strategies, multi-factor models, or index-based products such as smart beta exchange-traded funds (ETFs). Factor investing has been documented not only in equities but also in corporate bonds, government bonds, currencies, and commodities.

Critics argue that some factors may reflect statistical data mining, rather than persistent economic effects, that their performance can deteriorate as strategies become crowded, and that trading costs may reduce or eliminate the return premiums.

== History ==
The earliest theory of factor investing originated with a research paper by Stephen A. Ross in 1976 on arbitrage pricing theory, which argued that security returns are best explained by multiple factors. Prior to this, the Capital Asset Pricing Model (CAPM), theorized by academics in the 1960s, held sway. CAPM held that there was one factor that was the driver of stock returns and that a stock's expected return is a function of its equity market risk or volatility, quantified as beta. The first tests of the Capital Asset Pricing Model (CAPM) showed that the risk-return relation was too flat.

Sanjoy Basu was the first academic to document a value premium in 1977. In 1981, a paper by Rolf Banz established a size premium in stocks: smaller company stocks outperform larger companies over long time periods, and had done so for at least the previous 40 years.

In 1992 and 1993, Eugene F. Fama and Kenneth French published their seminal three-factor papers that introduce size and value as additional factors next to the market factor. In the early 1990s, Sheridan Titman and Narasimhan Jegadeesh showed that there was a premium for investing in high momentum stocks. In 2015, Fama and French added profitability and investment as two additional factors in their five-factor asset pricing model. Profitability is also referred to as the quality factor. Other significant factors that have been identified are leverage, liquidity, and volatility.

== Value factor ==
The most well-known factor is the value factor. The opportunity to capitalize on the value factor arises from the fact that when stocks suffer weakness in their fundamentals, leading the market to overreact and undervalue them significantly relative to their current earnings. A systematic quantitative value factor investing strategy strategically purchases these undervalued stocks and maintains the position until the market adjusts its pessimistic outlook. Value can be assessed using various metrics, including the P/E ratio, P/B ratio, P/S ratio, and dividend yield. Value-factor stocks are low-priced because they are riskier.

The value factor is not to be confused with value investing, which aims to identify investment opportunities priced below their intrinsic value.

== Low-volatility factor ==
Low-volatility investing is a strategy that involves acquiring stocks or securities with low volatility while avoiding those with high volatility, exploiting the low-volatility anomaly. The low-volatility anomaly was identified in the early 1970s, but gained popularity after the 2008 financial crisis. Different studies demonstrate its effectiveness over extended periods. Despite widespread practical use, academic enthusiasm varies, and notably, the factor is not incorporated into the Fama-French five-factor model. Low-volatility tends to reduce losses in bear markets, while often lagging during bull markets, necessitating a full business cycle for comprehensive evaluation.

== Momentum factor ==
Momentum investing involves buying stocks or securities with high returns over the past three to twelve months and selling those with poor returns over the same period. Despite its establishment as a phenomenon, there is no consensus explanation, posing challenges to the efficient market hypothesis and random walk hypothesis. Due to higher turnover and the lack of a clear risk-based explanation, the factor is not incorporated into the Fama-French five-factor model. Seasonal effects, like the January effect, may contribute to the success of momentum investing.

== Criticism ==
Academic and practitioner critics have raised several concerns about factor investing.

A first criticism relates to statistical robustness. In a 2019 paper, Rob Arnott, Campbell Harvey and colleagues argue that many reported factors may be the result of data mining rather than genuine economic effects. Of the hundreds of proposed factors, only a small subset show statistically significant and persistent performance in real-world scenarios. They also note that correlations between factors can change over time, which may reduce diversification benefits during periods of market stress. A 2025 paper proposed research on factor investing had often confused correlation and causation, and had failed to demonstrate convincingly that the identified factors caused certain results rather than simply correlating with the results.

Another line of criticism concerns implementation challenges. Arnott and colleagues (2016) highlight the risk of factor crowding, where popular factors attract large investor flows, driving up valuations and lowering future returns. Patton and Weller (2020) further suggest that trading costs and market frictions can significantly erode the theoretical returns of many factor strategies, particularly those with high turnover.

Some critics point to conceptual limitations. Daniel Peris argues that factor investing can reduce companies to mathematical abstractions and overlook their underlying traits that are not easily quantifiable to neat formulas.

== See also ==
- Style investing
- Quality investing
- Fama–French three-factor model
- Carhart four-factor model
- Financial economics § Portfolio theory
