= EV/GCI =

Financial ratio

EV/GCI (enterprise value/gross cash invested) is an advanced valuation multiple used to compare a company's book value of its assets to their current market value. The ratio is similar to P/B ratio, but EV/GCI is calculated on an EV-basis, taking into account all the company's security-holders.

== Formula ==
GCI (Gross cash invested) = (Gross tangible and intangible assets before depreciation or write-offs) + (investments in associates) + (working capital)

When EV/GCI is higher than 1, then the market is willing to pay a valuation premium. A discount takes place in the opposite case.

== Use in valuation ==
EV/GCI has been used in CROCI-based equity valuation frameworks. Goldman Sachs research materials describing the "Director's Cut" methodology present EV/GCI alongside cash return on capital invested (CROCI) as part of a returns-based approach to equity valuation.

In the same material, Goldman Sachs stated that companies with leading CROCI historically traded at a premium under the Director's Cut methodology on EV/GCI, and presented historical EV/GCI ranges by CROCI quartile.
