= Style drift =

Style drift occurs when a mutual fund's actual and declared investment style differs. A mutual fund’s declared investment style can be found in the fund prospectus which investors commonly rely upon to aid their investment decisions. For most investors, they assumed that mutual fund managers will invest according to the advertised guidelines, this is however, not the case for a fund with style drift. Style drift is commonplace in today’s mutual fund industry, making no distinction between developed and developing markets according to studies, e.g., in the United States and in China.

== Implications ==
When style drift presents in a mutual fund, the investment information about the fund becomes misleading. Given that in reality, style drift is generally undetected, the information asymmetry of investment information has important consequences for fund investors seeking to maximize fund returns. Researchers demonstrate that a fund, once deviated, is essentially a different product, with a risk-return profile that is not aligned with the investor’s initial investment goals. This is supported by a recent study, where researchers find that style drift prevents fund managers from picking (superior) stocks meeting investors' expectation for fund performance. The same study finds also that fund managers have a tendency to use style drift to maximize compensation, an instance of an agency problem in the mutual fund industry.

== Active portfolio and style investing ==
It is widely acknowledged that style drift is a common practice particularly by active mutual funds in the financial markets. While passive funds (often called "index funds") employ a buy and hold strategy often following an index, active funds take on an active investment approach by picking stocks that move in and out of the market. It is therefore common for active funds to embrace different investment styles and consequently, investors of active mutual funds need to keep an eye on their fund's risks exposure since style drift can impact risk exposure.

The rise of funds’ investment styles can be traced back to studies on market anomalies. Researchers here view that stock returns are driven by factors related to “size”. and “valuation” effects other than a single factor exposure of market risk under the assumptions of the Capital Asset Pricing Model (“CAPM”) developed by Sharpe-Lintner-Mossin in the 1960s.

The findings that stocks have distinctive characteristics exist, resulted in the rise of investment style. This stock style, in turn, has prompted the creation of numerous style indexes to track various stock market segments, for example, Standard &Poor’s (S&P) style indices 500 (S&P 500) to represent large-cap market, mid-cap market is represented by S&P mid-cap 400, small-cap market is represented by S&P small-cap 600, growth and value indices.

Depending on a fund's investment objective, its fund manager must adopt various investment strategies (see Investment strategy) in its portfolio construction to add value to fund returns. Strategies can be categorized into:

1. technical analysis – contrarian or momentum approach; and/or
2. anomalies/stock attributes—calendar effect, stock characteristics with respect to size, value or growth.

It is an industry-wide practice that mutual funds are categorized into investment styles that reflect the investment objectives and the underlying strategy of funds. The practice is brought about by a market anomaly in a financial market demonstrating that different investment styles have dissimilar risk and return characteristics that serves important implications on fund performance attribution and outcome.

== Style drift definition and metrics ==
Style drift is often referred to as “portfolio/style tilt”, “style volatility”, and “style shifting” by researchers and practitioners to broadly account for the divergence of a fund’s actual investment style from its declared contractual investment strategy in the fund prospectus. To determine the investment style of an active fund, and subsequently to detect style drift, two methods are commonly used. They are:

- Returns-based style analysis
- Holdings-based style analysis

=== Returns-based style analysis ===
Returns-based approach is a simpler approach to determining the investment style of an active funds. It is done by regressing fund returns against the returns of a set of passive style indexes or some constructed portfolios. While returns-based method is a low-cost approach, it has a few disadvantages in respect of its measurement. Specifically, it is advantageous to use a returns-based style technique if investment style of a mutual fund is stable over time; the technique also assumes factor exposures are constant.

=== Holdings-based style analysis ===
In contrast to returns-based technique, holdings-based approach better reflects the true investment style of an active fund but analysis requires more time and is more costly to execute. Essentially, holdings-based technique examines the actual stock characteristics in the portfolio holdings. Fund portfolio holdings offer knowledge on the characteristics of the stocks which needs be assessed individually. Example of these stock style attributes are size, value and growth dimensions.

== Style drift on fund returns ==
The outcome of how an active mutual fund is managed is of great importance to fund investors. One of the key conclusions in the existing literature is that some funds perform worse than others due to larger portfolio risk exposure and higher trading costs which are found to be correlated with greater volatility in investment style. In another study by Chua and Tam (2020), fund managers engage in style drift are found to have weaker stock picking abilities. This risk taking through style drift can thus cause a possible loss of confidence in the fund market.

== See also ==
- Stochastic drift
- Post–earnings-announcement drift
- Portfolio (finance)
- Asset allocation
- Investment style
- Active management
- Active risk
- Financial risk management § Investment management
