= Low-volatility investing =

Low-volatility investing is an investment style that buys stocks or securities with low volatility and avoids those with high volatility. This investment style exploits the low-volatility anomaly. According to financial theory risk and return should be positively related, however in practice this is not true. Low-volatility investors aim to achieve market-like returns, but with lower risk. This investment style is also referred to as minimum volatility, minimum variance, managed volatility, smart beta, defensive and conservative investing.

== History ==
The low-volatility anomaly was already discovered in the early 1970s, yet it only became a popular investment style after the 2008 global financial crises. The first tests of the Capital Asset Pricing Model (CAPM) showed that the risk-return relation was too flat. Two decades later, in 1992 the seminal study by Fama and French clearly showed that market beta (risk) and return were not related when controlling for firm size. Fisher Black argued that firms or investors could apply leverage by selling bonds and buying more low-beta equity to profit from the flat risk-return relation. In the 2000s more studies followed, and investors started to take notice. In the same period, asset managers such as Acadian, Robeco and Unigestion started offering this new investment style to investors. A few years later index providers such as MSCI and S&P started to create low-volatility indices.

== Performance ==
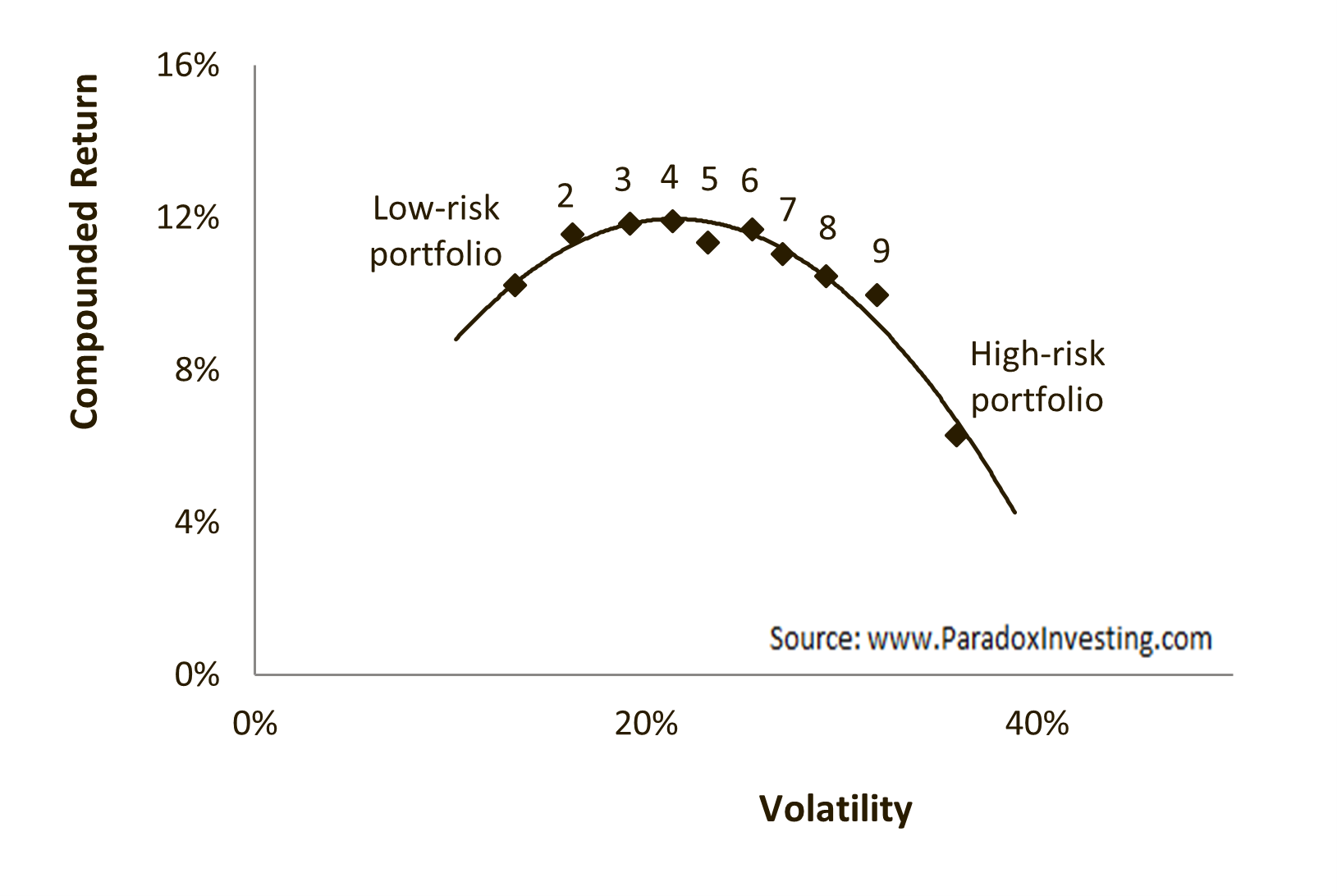
10 portfolios of stocks sorted on volatility: US 1929-2023

Low-volatility investing is gradually gaining acceptance due to consistent real-life performance over more than 15 years, encompassing both bull and bear markets. While many academic studies and indices are based on simulations going back 20-30 years, some research spans over 90 years, showing low-volatility stocks outperform high-volatility stocks in the long run (see image). Since low-volatility securities tend to lag during bull markets and tend to reduce losses in bear markets, a full business cycle is needed to assess performance. Over shorter time periods, such as one year, Jensen's alpha is a useful performance metric, adjusting returns for market beta risk. For instance, a low-volatility strategy with a beta of 0.7 in a 10% rising market would be expected to return 7%. If the actual return is 10%, Jensen's alpha is 3%.

== Criticism ==
Any investment strategy can lose effectiveness over time if its popularity causes its advantage to be arbitraged away. This could apply to low-volatility investing, highlighted by the high valuations of low-volatility stocks in the late 2010s. Still, David Blitz showed that hedge funds are at the other side of the low-volatility trade, despite their ability to use leverage. Others state that low-volatility is related to the well-known value investing style. For example, after the dot-com bubble, value stocks offered protection similar to low volatility stocks. Additionally, low-volatility stocks also tend to have more interest rate risk compared to other stocks. The year 2020 was challenging for US low-volatility stocks, as they significantly lagged behind the broader market by wide margins. Criticism and discussions are primarily found in various academic financial journals, but investors take notice and contribute to this debate.

== See also ==
- Low-volatility anomaly
- Investment style / Style investing
- Value investing
- Momentum investing
