= Bank of Montana =

American bank

The Bank of Montana is an investment-style business bank in Missoula, Montana. It was founded in 1998 by Tom Swenson, as the Montana Business Capital Corporation. It provided funding strategies and packages employing funding opportunities from the likes of Montana Board of Investments and Small Business Association. The State of Montana made it a chartered bank in 2007. The Bank of Montana offers business and personal banking across the United States.

Bancorp Montana Holding Company is the holding company.
