= Market timing =

Buying or selling per prediction of market price trends

Market timing is the strategy of making buying or selling decisions of financial assets (often stocks) by attempting to predict future market price movements (market trends). The prediction may be based on an outlook of market or economic conditions resulting from technical or fundamental analysis. This is an investment strategy based on the outlook for an aggregate market rather than for a particular financial asset.

The efficient-market hypothesis is an assumption that asset prices reflect all available information, meaning that it is theoretically impossible to systematically "beat the market".

== Approaches ==
Market timing can cause poor performance.

After fees, the average "trend follower" does not show skills or abilities compared to benchmarks. "Trend Tracker" reported returns are distorted by survivor bias, selection bias, and fill bias.

At the Federal Reserve Bank of St. Louis, YiLi Chien, Senior Economist wrote about return-chasing behavior. The average equity mutual fund investor tends to buy mutual funds with high past returns and sell otherwise. Buying mutual funds with high returns is called a "return-chasing behavior". Equity mutual fund flows have a positive correlation with past performance, with a return-flow correlation coefficient of 0.49. Stock market returns are almost unpredictable in the short term. Stock market returns tend to go back to the long-term average. The tendency to buy mutual funds with high returns and sell those with low returns can reduce profit.

Institutional investors often use proprietary market-timing software developed internally that can be a trade secret. Some algorithms attempt to predict the future superiority of stocks versus bonds (or vice versa), have been published in peer-reviewed journals.

Market timing often looks at moving averages such as 50- and 200-day moving averages (which are particularly popular). Some people believe that if the market has gone above the 50- or 200-day average that should be considered bullish, or below conversely bearish. Technical analysts consider it significant when one moving average crosses over another. The market timers then predict that the trend will, more likely than not, continue in the future. Others say, "nobody knows" and that world economies and stock markets are of such complexity that market-timing strategies are unlikely to be more profitable than buy-and-hold strategies.

Moving average strategies are simple to understand, and often claim to give good returns, but the results may be confused by hindsight and data mining.

A major stumbling block for many market timers is a phenomenon called "curve fitting", which states that a given set of trading rules tends to be over-optimized to fit the particular dataset for which it has been back-tested. Unfortunately, if the trading rules are over-optimized they often fail to work on future data. Market timers attempt to avoid these problems by looking for clusters of parameter values that work well or by using out-of-sample data, which ostensibly allows the market timer to see how the system works on unforeseen data. Critics, however, argue that once the strategy has been revised to reflect such data it is no longer "out-of-sample".

== Mutual funds ==
Mutual fund flows are published by organizations like Investment Company Institute, Lipper, Morningstar, and TrimTabs. They show that flows generally track the overall level of the market: investors buy stocks when prices are high, and sell stocks when prices are low. For example, in the beginning of the 2000s, the largest inflows to stock mutual funds were in early 2000 while the largest outflows were in mid-2002. These mutual fund flows were near the start of a significant bear (downtrending) market and bull (uptrending) market respectively. A similar pattern is repeated near the end of the decade.

This mutual fund flow data seems to indicate that most investors (despite what they may say) actually follow a buy-high, sell-low strategy. Studies confirm that the general tendency of investors is to buy after a stock or mutual fund price has increased. This surge in the number of buyers may then drive the price even higher. However, eventually, the supply of buyers becomes exhausted, and the demand for the stock declines and the stock or fund price also declines. After inflows, there may be a short-term boost in return, but the significant result is that the return over a longer time is disappointing.

Researchers suggest that, after periods of higher returns, individual investors will sell their value stocks and buy growth stocks. Frazzini and Lamont find that, in general, growth stocks have a lower return, but growth stocks with high inflows have a much worse return.

Studies find that the average investor's return in stocks is much less than the amount that would have been obtained by simply holding an index fund consisting of all stocks contained in the S&P 500 index.

For the 20-year period to the end of 2008, the inflation-adjusted market return was about 5.3% on average per year. The average investor managed to turn $1 million into $800,000, against $2.7 million for the index (after fund costs).

Studies by the financial services market research company Dalbar say that the retention rate for bond and stock funds is three years. This means that in a 20-year period the investor changed funds seven times. Balanced funds are a bit better at four years, or five times. Some trading is necessary since not only is the investor return less than the best asset class, it is typically worse than the worst asset class, which would be better. Balanced funds may be better by reason of investor psychology.

Financial advisors often agree that investors have poor timing, becoming less risk averse when markets are high and more risk averse when markets are low, a strategy that will actually result in less wealth in the long-term compared to someone who consistently invests over a long period regardless of market trends. This is consistent with recency bias and seems contrary to the acrophobia explanation. Similarly, Peter Lynch has stated that "Far more money has been lost by investors preparing for corrections or trying to anticipate corrections than has been lost in the corrections themselves."

Proponents of the efficient-market hypothesis (EMH) claim that prices reflect all available information. EMH assumes that investors are highly intelligent and perfectly rational. However, others dispute this assumption. In particular, proponents of behavioral finance claim that investors are irrational but their biases are consistent and predictable.

October 14, 2026, U.S. equity funds brought in $13.01 billion after losing $5.1 billion the week before. Technology funds went the other way, losing $5.21 billion their biggest weekly outflow since June.

== Viability of market timing ==
Whether market timing is ever a viable investment strategy is controversial. Some may consider market timing to be a form of gambling based on pure chance, because they do not believe in undervalued or overvalued markets. The efficient-market hypothesis claims that financial prices always exhibit random walk behavior and thus cannot be predicted with consistency.

Some consider market timing to be sensible in certain situations, such as an apparent bubble. However, because the economy is a complex system that contains many factors, even at times of significant market optimism or pessimism, it remains difficult, if not impossible, to predetermine the local maximum or minimum of future prices with any precision; a so-called bubble can last for many years before prices collapse. Likewise, a crash can persist for extended periods; stocks that appear to be "cheap" at a glance, can often become much cheaper afterwards, before then either rebounding at some time in the future or heading toward bankruptcy.

Proponents of market timing counter that market timing is just another name for trading. They argue that "attempting to predict future market price movements" is what all traders do, regardless of whether they trade individual stocks or collections of stocks, aka, mutual funds. Thus if market timing is not a viable investment strategy, the proponents say, then neither is any of the trading on the various stock exchanges. Those who disagree with this view usually advocate a buy-and-hold strategy with periodic "re-balancing".

Others contend that predicting the next event that will affect the economy and stock prices is notoriously difficult. For examples, consider the many unforeseeable, unpredictable, uncertain events between 1985 and 2013 that are shown in Figures 1 to 6 [pages 37 to 42] of Measuring Economic Policy Uncertainty.

A 2004 study suggested that the best predictor of a fund's consistent outperformance of the market was low expenses and low turnover, not pursuit of a value or contrarian strategy.

Several independent organizations (e.g., Timer Digest and Hulbert Financial Digest) have tracked some market timers' performance for over thirty years. These organizations have found that purported market timers in many cases do no better than chance, or even worse.

== See also ==
- Stock market prediction – Predicting future value of company stock
- Sector rotation – Theory of stock market trading patterns
- Style investing – Investment approach
- Stock market cycles
- Market trend – Perceived financial market movement tendency over time
- Asset allocation – Investment strategy
- Great Recession in the United States – Major economic downturn in the United States
- Dynamic factor – Economic time series comparator In econometrics, a dynamic factor (also known as a diffusion index) were originally designed to help identify business cycle turning points.
