= Cabot Wealth Network =

American investment advisory company

Coordinates: 42.52997°N 70.90589°W

- Company type: Private
- Website type: Financial advisory services
- Founded: 1970
- Headquarters: Salem, Massachusetts, United States
- Founder: Carlton G. Lutts
- Key people: Ed Coburn, CEO; Nancy Graves, COO; Mike Cintolo, Chief Investment Strategist; Tim Lutts, Publisher Emeritus
- Employees: 31
- Website: cabotwealth.com

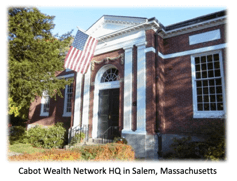
Photo: CabotWealth.com

Cabot Wealth Network is an independent investment advisory company based in Salem, Massachusetts. The company's primary service is the publication of 12 investment advisory newsletters, which cover a range of investment styles, with an estimated 225,000 readers. It also publishes the Cabot Wealth Daily website and newsletter. Founded in 1970 by the late Carlton Lutts Jr.

== Cabot Growth Investor ==
The company's flagship advisory, Cabot Growth Investor (formerly Cabot Market Letter), was first published on October 12, 1970, out of the home of Carlton Lutts Jr. Now edited by Michael Cintolo, it is considered a successful veteran newsletter. Most recently, it distinguished itself by anticipating the 2008 recession and then catching the subsequent rebound. The letter leads the other Cabot advisories for most awards, with accolades from Timer Digest, Hulbert Financial Digest and the Specialized Information Publishers Foundation.

== Products/services ==
Cabot produces numerous other paid subscription newsletters that reflect various investment styles: Cabot Stock of the Week, Cabot Top Ten Trader, Cabot Small-Cap Confidential, Cabot Dividend Investor, Cabot Options Trader, Cabot Growth Investor, Cabot Undervalued Stocks Advisor, Cabot SX Cannabis Advisor and others, both of which were acquired from founding publisher Dick Davis in 2008. The company also publishes a free e-newsletter, Cabot Wealth Daily and a number of reports.

Cabot's newsletters are researched and written by a staff of financial analysts who are cited and interviewed by major news outlets about market trends and current topics such as electric cars and the Chinese economy.

== Strategy ==
Cabot combines market timing with a stock selection system based on fundamental and technical factors. Its analysts have developed several proprietary market-timing indicators used to make recommendations, including the Two-Second Indicator and the Cabot Tides. Cabot conducts its research independently; Timothy Lutts has voiced his disapproval of investment newsletters that accept sponsorship from a business and in return promote its stock.

== Recognition ==
Cabot analysts have received accolades for their picks and timing. In recent years, three analysts were featured by MoneyShow for their stock picking acumen in 2017. Chloe Lutts Jensen was featured as a top woman advisor by Forbes in 2017. For 2018, Mike Cintolo, Chief Analyst of Cabot Growth Investor, was recognized by MoneyShow for having the top pick among all the financial advisors it surveyed with an 81% gain and Crista Huff and Nancy Zambell were featured in the MoneyShow annual Top Stock Picks from Leading Women Advisors for 2019.
