= Mark Carhart =

Mark M. Carhart
- Occupations: Finance Researcher, Market Statistician, Author
- Organization: Kepos Capital
- Known for: Carhart four-factor model

Mark Carhart is a finance researcher, market statistician and quantitative investment manager known for extending the Fama–French three-factor model with a momentum factor. He is currently chief investment officer of New York quantitative hedge fund, Kepos Capital.

== Early life and education ==
Mark earned his Bachelor of Arts degree from Yale University in 1988. He became a CFA Charterholder in 1991 and went on to receive his Ph.D. from the University of Chicago Booth School of Business in 1995.

== Career ==
Carhart served as Co–Chief Investment Officer of the Quantitative Investment Strategies Group at Goldman Sachs Asset Management, where the team oversaw more than $185 billion in assets at its peak. He was named Managing Director in 1999 and became a Partner in 2004.

Prior to joining Goldman Sachs, Mark was an Assistant Professor of Finance and Business Economics at the Marshall School of Business at the University of Southern California, a Senior Fellow at the Wharton Financial Institutions Center, and a consultant for Dimensional Fund Advisors (DFA) and Mercer Global Advisors.

He serves on the non-profit board of InTandem Cycling since 2013 and the Investment Committee of the Convent of the Sacred Heart New York.

In 2010, he founded Kepos Capital together with Giorgio De Santis and Robert Litterman.

== Selected publications ==
- Carhart, Mark M. (1997-05-15). "Mutual Fund Survivorship". USC working paper. 97 (1): 51.
- Carhart, Mark M. (1997). "On Persistence in Mutual Fund Performance". The Journal of Finance (52): 57–82.
