= Smart beta =

Investment strategy that adds active features to passive strategies

Smart beta investment portfolios are long-only rules-based investment strategies that aim to outperform a capitalization-weighted benchmark.

The term smart beta was originally coined by Willis Towers Watson in 2006 referring to the fundamental index.

== Approach ==
Common factor based smart beta types revolve around the following ideas for optimization:

- Liquidity: Amihud ratio – median ratio of absolute daily return to daily traded value over the previous year
- Momentum: residual Sharpe ratio
- Quality: composite of profitability (return on assets), efficiency (change in asset turnover), earnings quality (accruals) & leverage
- Size: full market capitalization
- Value: composite of trailing cash-flow yield, earnings yield and country relative sales to price ratio.
- Volatility: standard deviation of five years of weekly (wed/wed) local total returns
- Fundamental Index (RAFI): index based on the fundamentals of enterprise value, book value, revenue, cashflow and dividends.

== Product landscape ==
Asset managers including BlackRock, Legg Mason, Invesco and WisdomTree all operate smart beta funds. To identify which type of smart beta provides the best fit, qualified institutional investors need to understand the expected return and risk for each of their active, passive, and smart beta allocations.

== Demand and analysis ==
Smart beta strategies have generated considerable interest from institutional investors, particularly during the 2008 financial crisis.

According to ETF.com, as of April 2019 there was approximately $880 billion invested in smart beta funds. The increase in demand has led to an increase in the number of products and there are more than 1000 smart beta ETFs on the market today.

The demand/growth does not appear to be slowing as of 2019. In the 12-month period As of February 2019 77 new smart beta ETFs launched accounting for roughly 1/3 of all ETFs launched in the 12 month period. According to Morningstar, as of June 2020 there were 632 strategic-beta exchange traded products with $869.7 billion in assets.

A 2020 analysis of smart beta strategies in the US market reported that, in aggregate, exchange traded funds using such strategies have underperformed a comparable benchmark by about 1% on average since launch. This analysis also argued smart beta strategies are often promoted on the basis of hypothetical backtests and data mining which do not necessarily lead to better real-world investing returns.

== See also ==
- Factor investing
- Financial economics § Portfolio theory
- Risk factor (finance)
