= Cash return on capital invested =

Type of financial ratio

Cash return on capital invested (CROCI) is an advanced measure of corporate profitability, originally developed by Deutsche Bank's equity research department in 1996 (it now sits within DWS Group). This measure compares a post-tax, pre-interest cash flow to the gross level of capital invested and is a useful measure of a company’s ability to generate cash returns on its investments.

In principle, this ratio is similar to the ROE ratio, but CROCI is calculated on a cash basis and on an EV-basis, taking into account assets funded by all the company's security-holders.

== Formula ==
CROCI is calculated as the internal rate of return in a particular year of a company's gross post-tax cash flows after investing the gross capital invested over the total asset life of the firm. In principle, this should be equivalent to the ratio of the free cash flow of that year to the net capital invested, provided depreciation is calculated economically and the only capex is for maintenance.

== Uses ==
- The (CROCI – WACC) spread is a key measure of shareholder value creation and competitive advantage. If the spread is positive, a company creates value and destroys it otherwise.
- The CROCI/WACC ratio is basically the same metric signaling value creation or destruction. If the ratio is higher than 1, a company creates value, and it destroys value if the ratio is below 1.
- CROCI can be compared to a company's economic price to book (broadly equivalent to a company's Tobin's Q) to calculate an Economic P/E.
