= Momentum crash =

Sudden decline in a momentum investment

A momentum crash is a sudden and significant decline in the performance of a momentum-based investment strategy, which involves buying assets that have shown an upward price trend and selling those with a downward trend. While this strategy can be profitable, it is also prone to sudden reversals that can result in large losses. These reversals can occur without warning, leading to a sharp drop in the value of the assets held by momentum investors.

Momentum crashes often occur during periods of market stress or when market sentiment shifts rapidly. For example, if a market trending upwards suddenly declines, stocks that had been performing well can drop sharply, causing significant losses for momentum investors. These crashes are frequently seen during market corrections, when the overall market declines after a prolonged uptrend, leading to a significant drop in momentum stocks.

Economic shifts can also trigger momentum crashes. Unexpected economic data or changes in economic conditions can cause a sudden reversal in market trends, adversely affecting momentum strategies. Additionally, investor behavior, such as herding, where many investors follow the same trend, can lead to overcrowded trades. When these trades unwind, it can cause sharp price declines, exacerbating the momentum crash.

Liquidity issues are another factor that can contribute to momentum crashes. During market stress, liquidity can dry up, leading to larger price swings for momentum stocks. This lack of liquidity means it becomes harder to sell off assets quickly without significantly impacting their prices, which can lead to steep declines in the value of these stocks during a crash.

To manage the risk of momentum crashes, investors often diversify their portfolios, use stop-loss orders, and incorporate other investment strategies to balance the risks associated with momentum investing. These measures can help mitigate the potential for significant losses when a momentum crash occurs.
