= Morningstar Style Box =

Grid of nine squares

The Morningstar Style Box is a grid of nine squares used to identify the investment style of stocks and mutual funds. Developed by Don Phillips and John Rekenthaler of Morningstar, Inc., the Style Box was launched in 1992.

The vertical axis of the Style Box represents an investment's size category: small, mid and large. The horizontal axis depicts fund investment style categories such as "value" and "growth," which are common to stocks and funds. The "blend" definition in the central column differs for stocks and funds. “For stocks, the central column of the Style Box will represent the core style (those for which neither value or growth characteristics dominate); for funds, it will represent the blend style (a mixture of growth and value stocks or mostly core stocks).”

Example of the box in use
	Value	Blend	Growth
Large-cap	17	17	17
Mid-cap	10	10	10
Small-cap	6	6	6

The box above represents an asset allocation which is biased towards larger-caps, while being balanced across the columns.

== See also ==
- Ternary plot, which is used to display allocations across economic sectors.
