= Neglected firm effect =

Stock market anomaly

The neglected firm effect is the market anomaly phenomenon of lesser-known firms producing abnormally high returns on their stocks. The companies that are followed by fewer analysts will earn higher returns on average than companies that are followed by many analysts. The abnormally high return exhibited by neglected firms may be due to the lower liquidity or higher risks associated with the stock. At the same time, the impact on returns, and regarding earnings management is not always clear.

According to Investopedia: "Neglected firms are usually the small firms that analysts tend to ignore. Information available on these companies tends to be limited to those items that are required by law, on the other hand, have a higher profile, which provides large amounts of high quality information (in addition to legally required forms) to institutional investors such as pension or mutual fund companies."
