= Liquidity premium =

Economic theory

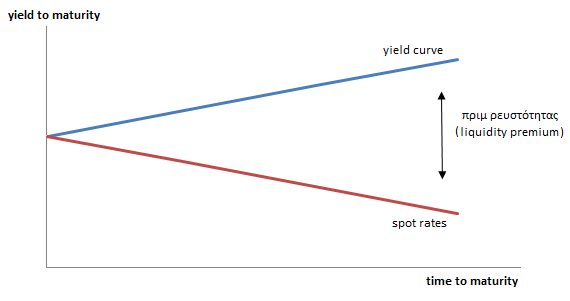
Graph of liquidity Premium

In economics, a liquidity premium is the explanation for a difference between two types of financial securities (e.g. stocks), that have all the same qualities except liquidity. It is a segment of a three-part theory that works to explain the behavior of yield curves for interest rates. The upwards-curving component of the interest yield can be explained by the liquidity premium. The reason behind this is that short term securities are less risky compared to long term rates due to the difference in maturity dates. Therefore investors expect a premium, or risk premium for investing in the risky security. Liquidity risk premiums are recommended to be used with longer-term investments, where those particular investments are illiquid.

Assets that are traded on an organized market are more liquid. Financial disclosure requirements are more stringent for listed companies. For a given economic result, organized liquidity and transparency make the value of quoted share higher than the market value of an unquoted share.

== Pricing Liquidity Premium ==
Practitioners struggle with the valuation of illiquid securities. Longstaff (1995) calculates the upper bound for this premium by assuming that without trading restrictions, an investor with perfect market-timing ability can sell a security at its maximum price during the period in which the security is restricted from trading. Thus, the upper bound for the liquidity premium is priced as the difference between this maximum price during the restricted trading period and the security price at the end of this period. Abudy and Raviv (2016) extend this framework for the special case of corporate bonds by using a structural approach for pricing a corporate security. Consistent with the empirical literature the liquidity premium is positively related to the issuing firm's asset risk and leverage ratio and increases with a bond's credit quality. The term structure of illiquidity spread has a humped shape, where its maximum level depends on the firm's leverage ratio.

== See also ==
- Liquidity preference
- Risk premium
- Size premium
