= Returns-based style analysis =

Statistical technique used to deconstruct the returns of investment strategies

Returns-based style analysis (RBSA) is a statistical technique used in finance to deconstruct the returns of investment strategies using a variety of explanatory variables. The model results in a strategy's exposures to asset classes or other factors, interpreted as a measure of a fund or portfolio manager's investment style. While the model is most frequently used to show an equity mutual fund’s style with reference to common style axes (such as large/small and value/growth), recent applications have extended the model’s utility to model more complex strategies, such as those employed by hedge funds.

== History ==
William F. Sharpe first presented the model in his 1988 article "Determining a Fund’s Effective Asset Mix". Under the name RBSA, this model was made available in commercial software soon after and retains a consistent presence in mutual fund analysis reporting.

As the investment community has expanded beyond security selection to the embrace of asset allocation as the critical driver of performance, additional papers and studies further supported the concept of using RBSA in conjunction with holdings-based analysis. In 1995, the paper 'Determinants of Portfolio Performance' by Gary Brinson, L. Randolph Hood, and Gilbert L. Beebower, demonstrated that asset allocation decisions accounted for greater than 90% of the variability in a portfolio's performance.

== Concept ==
RBSA uses the capital asset pricing model as its backbone, of which William Sharpe was also a primary contributor. In CAPM, a single index is often used as a proxy to represent the return of the market. The first step is to extend this to allow for multiple market proxy indices, thus:

$$R_t^m=\alpha+\sum\limits_{i=1}^I\beta^iR_t^i+\epsilon_t$$

where:

- $R_t^m$ is the time stream of historical manager returns,
- $R_t^i$ is a set of time streams of market indices or factors,
- $I$ is the number of indices or factors used in analysis,
- $\alpha$ is the intercept of the regression equation, often interpreted as manager skill,
- $\epsilon_t$ is the error, to be minimized using ordinary least squares regression.

The beta coefficients are interpreted as exposures to the types of market returns represented by each chosen index. Since these exposures theoretically represent percentages of a replicating portfolio, we often apply the following constraints:

$\sum\limits_{i=1}^I\beta_i=1;\;\;\;\;\beta_i \geq 0\;\;\forall i.$

These constraints may be relaxed to allow for shorting, or if factors rather than indices are used; this modification brings the model closer to arbitrage pricing theory than to the Capital Asset Pricing Model.

The second improvement upon the simple CAPM construct suggested by Sharpe was to apply the model to rolling time intervals. Data during these intervals is exponentially weighted to increase the importance of data collected more recently. This addition allows for the alpha and beta coefficients to change over the historical period used in the analysis, an expected property of active management.

== Application ==
Application of the model involves repeated regressions over overlapping windows to compute an alpha and vector of betas for each, resulting in a statistical picture of a manager's style. Since 1992, this computation has been a feature of mutual fund analysis software produced by companies such as LIPPER, MPI, Zephyr Associates, and Morningstar.

The exposures calculated by RBSA software can provide various pictures of a fund's evolution, both in isolation and in comparison to similar strategies. This analysis is usually done to better understand a fund over an explicitly chosen period of time.

Since Sharpe's original formulation of the model, additional research and development has added to RBSA. A widely accepted addition has been the use of a centered window for historical periods. For example, a 36-month window calculating the exposures for January 2002 would reference data 18 months before and 18 months after, spanning the interval from July 2000 through June 2003. This provides for more accurate historical analysis and addresses a lag in the model's detection of style changes. However, this modification has been criticized for being unrealistic, since a centered window cannot be applied to today's return without knowing the future. The increased accuracy has usually been deemed worth the loss of generality.

Other generalizations to the model have been developed to do away with the fixed window constraint, such as models that employ Kalman filters to allow for more general time dilation. These methods still require assumed restrictions on the evolution of exposures, such as a return to normality assumption, or a fixed turnover parameter such as in Dynamic Style Analysis. These models are usually considered separate from classically defined ‘RBSA’, though they continue to analyze style based on returns.

=== Comparison with holdings-based analysis ===
Similar information describing a fund's investment style can be aggregated by comprehensive analysis of a fund's holdings. Returns-based analysis, which assesses the behavior of an investment vehicle versus known investment products (i.e., indices) is intended to be used in a complementary fashion with holdings-based analysis, which analyzes an investment vehicle by reviewing the actual underlying securities, funds and other instruments or portfolios that comprise the vehicle. For example, consider a mutual fund that holds ten 'large value' US stocks. Returns-based analysis would analyze the returns of the fund itself, and by comparing them to US equity indices, may determine that the fund is heavily exposed to the large-growth space. Holdings-based analysis would examine the fund's stated holdings, and provide the names and percentages of the stocks in question. Given that returns-based analysis is based on historical returns, it is used to comment on overall fund or portfolio behavior, whereas holdings-based analysis focuses entirely on the composition of a fund or portfolio at any given moment.

== See also ==
- Arbitrage pricing theory (APT)
- Capital asset pricing model (CAPM)
- Fama–French three-factor model
- Linear regression
- Modern portfolio theory
- Risk
- Single-index model
- Style analysis
- William F. Sharpe
