= Investment strategy =

Rules to develop an investment portfolio

In finance, an investment strategy is a set of rules, behaviors or procedures, designed to guide an investor's selection of an investment portfolio. Individuals have different profit objectives, and their individual skills make different tactics and strategies appropriate. Some choices involve a tradeoff between risk and return. Most investors fall somewhere in between, accepting some risk for the expectation of higher returns.

In the field of economics, this decision is driven by finding the investment strategy that has the highest utility. Investors frequently pick investments to hedge themselves against inflation. During periods of high inflation investments such as shares tend to perform less well in real terms.

The time horizon of investments also influences the strategy to be followed. Investments such as shares should be invested into with the time frame of a minimum of 5 years in mind. It is recommended in finance a minimum of 6 months to 12 months expenses in a rainy-day current account, giving instant access before investing in riskier investments than an instant access account. It is also recommended no more than 90% of your money in non-instant access shares. Unexpected expenses can happen. If someone does not have an income an income can be created by using share income funds.

== Strategies ==
- No strategy: Investors who do not have a strategy have been called "Sheep". Arbitrary choices modeled on throwing darts at a page (referencing earlier decades when stock prices were listed daily in the newspapers) have been called Blindfolded Monkeys Throwing Darts [no source]. This famous test had debatable outcomes.
- Active vs Passive: Passive strategies like buy and hold and passive indexing are often used to minimize transaction costs. Passive investors don't believe it is possible to time the market. Active strategies such as momentum trading are an attempt to outperform benchmark indexes. Active investors believe they have the better than average skills.
- Momentum Trading: One strategy is to select investments based on their recent past performance. Stocks that had higher returns for the recent 3 to 12 months tend to continue to perform better for the next few months compared to the stocks that had lower returns for the recent 3 to 12 months. There is evidence both for and against this strategy. See also Momentum investing and Momentum (finance).
- Buy and Hold: This strategy involves buying company shares or funds and holding them for a long period. It is a long-term investment strategy, based on the concept that in the long run equity markets give a good rate of return despite periods of volatility or decline. This viewpoint also holds that market timing, that one can enter the market on the lows and sell on the highs, does not work for small investors, so it is better to simply buy and hold.
- Long Short Strategy: A long short strategy consists of selecting a universe of equities and ranking them according to a combined alpha factor. Given the rankings, investors long the top percentile and short the bottom percentile of securities once every re-balancing period.
- Indexing: Indexing is where an investor buys a small proportion of all the shares in a market index such as the S&P 500, or more likely, an index mutual fund or an exchange-traded fund (ETF). This can be either a passive strategy if held for long periods, or an active strategy if the index is used to enter and exit the market quickly.
- Developed markets vs emerging markets: Many people use developed stock markets because they are believed to be safer than emerging markets. When investing globally you have the risk of changes in currency exchange rates on top of stock market performance. Other people pick emerging markets believing the emerging markets have higher potential for GDP growth which in turn would then affect positively the share prices in those countries. Emerging stock markets can be less well-regulated than those in the developed markets increasing risks and have greater political risks associated. The most common way of investing in global markets is through funds.
- Pairs Trading: Pairs trade is a trading strategy that consists of identifying similar pairs of stocks and taking a linear combination of their price so that the result is a stationary time-series. Investors can then compute Altman_Z-score for the stationary signal and trade on the spread assuming mean reversion: short the top asset and long the bottom asset.
- Value vs Growth: Value investing strategy looks at the intrinsic value of a company and value investors seek stocks of companies that they believed are undervalued. Growth investment strategy looks at the growth potential of a company and when a company that has expected earning growth that is higher than companies in the same industry or the market as a whole, it will attract the growth investors who are seeking to maximize their capital gain.

Be careful of value traps. This is where stocks have good P/E ratios or NAV's (net asset values) because the stock or sector is not predicted to do well into the future by the investor public e.g. in a declining market. It can also happen if a company's past performance has not been good in the past after a sharp selloff.

- Dividend growth investing: This strategy involves investing in company shares according to the future dividends forecast to be paid. Companies that pay consistent and predictable dividends tend to have less volatile share prices. Well-established dividend-paying companies will aim to increase their dividend payment each year, and those who make an increase for 25 consecutive years are referred to as a dividend aristocrat. Investors who reinvest the dividends are able to benefit from compounding of their investment over the longer term, whether directly invested or through a Dividend Reinvestment Plan (DRIP).
- Dollar cost averaging: The dollar cost averaging strategy is aimed at reducing the risk of incurring substantial losses resulted when the entire principal sum is invested just before the market falls.
- Contrarian investment: A contrarian investment strategy consists of selecting good companies in time of down market and buying a lot of shares of that company in order to make a long-term profit. In time of economic decline, there are many opportunities to buy good shares at reasonable prices. But, what makes a company good for shareholders? A good company is one that focuses on the long term value, the quality of what it offers or the share price. This company must have a durable competitive advantage, which means that it has a market position or branding which either prevents easy access by competitors or controls a scarce raw material source. Some examples of companies that response to these criteria are in the field of insurance, soft drinks, shoes, chocolates, home building, furniture and many more. Investors can see that there is nothing "fancy" or special about these fields of investment: they are commonly used by each and every one of us. Many variables must be taken into consideration when making the final decision for the choice of the company. Some of them are:
  - The company must be in a growing industry.
  - The company cannot be vulnerable to competition.
  - The company must have its earnings on an upward trend.
  - The company must have a consistent return on invested capital.
  - The company must be flexible to adjust prices for inflation.
- Investing in smaller companies: Historically medium-sized companies have outperformed large cap companies on the Stock market. Smaller companies again have had even higher returns. The very best returns by market cap size historically are from micro-cap companies. Investors using this strategy buy companies based on their small market cap size on the stock exchange. One of the greatest investors, Warren Buffett, made money in small companies early in his career combining it with value investing. He bought small companies with low P/E ratios and high assets to market cap.
- Micro-Investing: Micro-investing is a type of investment strategy that is designed to make investing regular, accessible and affordable, especially for those who may not have a lot of money to invest or who are new to investing.

== See also ==
- Asset allocation
- Buy and hold
- Bond (finance)
- CAN SLIM
- Contrarian investing
- Financial adviser
- Financial risk management § Investment management
- Intertemporal portfolio choice
- Investment fund
- Liability-driven investment strategy
- List of stock exchanges
- Market timing
- Portfolio optimization
- Stock market
- Time-weighted return on investment
- Trend following
