= Carhart four-factor model =

Model for stock portfolio management

In portfolio management, the Carhart four-factor model is an extra factor addition in the Fama–French three-factor model, proposed by Mark Carhart. The Fama-French model, developed in the 1990s, argued most stock market returns are explained by three factors: market beta (stocks more volatile than the broad market tending to outperform), price (value stocks tending to outperform) and company size (smaller company stocks tending to outperform). Carhart added a momentum factor for asset pricing of stocks. The Four Factor Model is also known in the industry as the Monthly Momentum Factor (MOM). Momentum is the speed or velocity of price changes in a stock, security, or tradable instrument.

== Development ==
The Monthly Momentum Factor (MOM) can be calculated by subtracting the equal weighted average of the lowest performing firms from the equal weighted average of the highest performing firms, lagged one month (Carhart, 1997). A stock would be considered to show momentum if its prior 12-month average of returns is positive, or greater. Similar to the three factor model, momentum factor is defined by self-financing portfolio of (long positive momentum)+(short negative momentum). Momentum strategies continue to be popular in financial markets. Financial analysts often incorporate the 52-week price high/low in their Buy/Sell recommendations.

The four factor model is commonly used as an active management and mutual fund evaluation model.

Three commonly used methods to adjust a mutual fund's returns for risk are:

1. The market model:

$$EXR_t=\alpha^J+
\beta_{mkt}\mathit{EXMKT}_t+\epsilon_t$$

The intercept in this model is referred to as the "Jensen's alpha".

2. The Fama–French three-factor model:

$$EXR_t=\alpha^{FF}+
\beta_{mkt}\mathit{EXMKT}_t+
\beta_{HML}\mathit{HML}_t+
\beta_{SMB}\mathit{SMB}_t+\epsilon_t$$

The intercept in this model is referred to as the "three-factor alpha".

3. The Carhart four-factor model:

$$EXR_t=\alpha^c+
\beta_{mkt}\mathit{EXMKT}_t+
\beta_{HML}\mathit{HML}_t+
\beta_{SMB}\mathit{SMB}_t+
\beta_{UMD}\mathit{UMD}_t+\epsilon_t$$

The intercept in this model is referred to as the "four-factor alpha".

$EXR_t$ is the monthly return to the asset of concern in excess of the monthly t-bill rate. We typically use these three models to adjust for risk. In each case, we regress the excess returns of the asset on an intercept (the alpha) and some factors on the right hand side of the equation that attempt to control for market-wide risk factors. The right hand side risk factors are: the monthly return of the CRSP value-weighted index less the risk free rate ($\mathit{EXMKT}_t$), monthly premium of the book-to-market factor ($\mathit{HML}_t$) the monthly premium of the size factor ($\mathit{SMB}_t$), and the monthly premium on winners minus losers ($\mathit{UMD}_t$) from Fama-French (1993) and Carhart (1997).

A fund manager shows forecasting ability when his fund has a positive and statistically significant alpha.

SMB is a zero-investment portfolio that is long on small capitalization (cap) stocks and short on big cap stocks. Similarly, HML is a zero-investment portfolio that is long on high book-to-market (B/M) stocks and short on low B/M stocks, and UMD is a zero-cost portfolio that is long previous 12-month return winners and short previous 12-month loser stocks.

== See also ==
- Capital asset pricing model (CAPM)
- Factor investing
- Fama–French three-factor model
- Momentum factor
- Returns-based style analysis
- Size premium
- Financial risk management § Investment management
