= Arbitrage pricing theory =

Asset pricing theory

In finance, arbitrage pricing theory (APT) is a multi-factor model for asset pricing which relates various macro-economic (systematic) risk variables to the pricing of financial assets. Proposed by economist Stephen Ross in 1976, it is widely believed to be an improved alternative to its predecessor, the capital asset pricing model (CAPM). APT is founded upon the law of one price, which suggests that within an equilibrium market, rational investors will implement arbitrage such that the equilibrium price is eventually realised. As such, APT argues that when opportunities for arbitrage are exhausted in a given period, then the expected return of an asset is a linear function of various factors or theoretical market indices, where sensitivities of each factor is represented by a factor-specific beta coefficient or factor loading. Consequently, it provides traders with an indication of ‘true’ asset value and enables exploitation of market discrepancies via arbitrage. The linear factor model structure of the APT is used as the basis for evaluating asset allocation, the performance of managed funds as well as the calculation of cost of capital. Furthermore, the newer APT model is more dynamic being utilised in more theoretical application than the preceding CAPM model. A 1986 article written by Gregory Connor and Robert Korajczyk, utilised the APT framework and applied it to portfolio performance measurement suggesting that the Jensen coefficient is an acceptable measurement of portfolio performance.

== Model ==
APT is a single-period static model, which helps investors understand the trade-off between risk and return. The average investor aims to optimise the returns for any given level or risk and as such, expects a positive return for bearing greater risk. As per the APT model, risky asset returns are said to follow a factor intensity structure if they can be expressed as:

$$r_j = a_j + \beta_{j1}f_1 + \beta_{j2}f_2 + \cdots + \beta_{jn}f_n + \epsilon_j$$

where
- $a_j$ is a constant for asset $j$.
- $f_i$ is a systematic factor for 1≤i≤n.
- $\beta_{ji}$ is the sensitivity of the $j$th asset to factor $f_i$, 1≤i≤n, also called factor loading.
- and $\epsilon_j$ is the risky asset's idiosyncratic random shock with mean zero.

Idiosyncratic shocks are assumed to be uncorrelated across assets and uncorrelated with the factors.

The APT model states that if asset returns follow a factor structure then the following relation exists between expected returns and the factor sensitivities:

$$\mathbb{E}\left(r_j\right) = r_f + \beta_{j1}RP_1 + \beta_{j2}RP_2 + \cdots + \beta_{jn}RP_n$$

where
- $RP_i$ is the risk premium of factor $f_i$.
- $r_f$ is the risk-free rate.

That is, the expected return of an asset j is a linear function of the asset's sensitivities to the n factors.

Note that there are some assumptions and requirements that have to be fulfilled for the latter to be correct: There must be perfect competition in the market, and the total number of factors may never surpass the total number of assets (in order to avoid the problem of matrix singularity).

=== General Model ===
For a set of assets with returns $r\in\mathbb{R}^{m}$, factor loadings $\Lambda \in\mathbb{R}^{m\times n}$, and factors $f\in\mathbb{R}^{n}$, a general factor model that is used in APT is:
$$r = r_{f} + \Lambda f + \epsilon, \quad \epsilon \sim \mathcal{N}(0,\Psi)$$
where $\epsilon$ follows a multivariate normal distribution. In general, it is useful to assume that the factors are distributed as:
$$f \sim \mathcal{N}(\mu,\Omega)$$
where $\mu$ is the expected risk premium vector and $\Omega$ is the factor covariance matrix. Assuming that the noise terms for the returns and factors are uncorrelated, the mean and covariance for the returns are respectively:
$$\mathbb{E}(r) = r_{f} + \Lambda \mu, \quad \text{Cov}(r) = \Lambda\Omega\Lambda^{T} + \Psi$$
It is generally assumed that we know the factors in a model, which allows least squares to be utilized. However, an alternative to this is to assume that the factors are latent variables and employ factor analysis - akin to the form used in psychometrics - to extract them.

=== Assumptions of APT Model ===
The APT model for asset valuation is founded on the following assumptions:

1. Investors are risk-averse in nature and possess the same expectations
2. Efficient markets with limited opportunity for arbitrage
3. Perfect capital markets
4. Infinite number of assets
5. Risk factors are indicative of systematic risks that cannot be diversified away and thus impact all financial assets, to some degree. Thus, these factors must be:
  - Non-specific to any individual firm or industry
  - Compensated by the market via a risk premium
  - A random variable

== Arbitrage ==
Arbitrage is the practice whereby investors take advantage of slight variations in asset valuation from its fair price, to generate a profit. It is the realisation of a positive expected return from overvalued or undervalued securities in the inefficient market without any incremental risk and zero additional investments.

=== Mechanics ===
In the APT context, arbitrage consists of trading in two assets – with at least one being mispriced. The arbitrageur sells the asset which is relatively too expensive and uses the proceeds to buy one which is relatively too cheap.

Under the APT, an asset is mispriced if its current price diverges from the price predicted by the model. The asset price today should equal the sum of all future cash flows discounted at the APT rate, where the expected return of the asset is a linear function of various factors, and sensitivity to changes in each factor is represented by a factor-specific beta coefficient.

A correctly priced asset here may be in fact a synthetic asset - a portfolio consisting of other correctly priced assets. This portfolio has the same exposure to each of the macroeconomic factors as the mispriced asset. The arbitrageur creates the portfolio by identifying n correctly priced assets (one per risk-factor, plus one) and then weighting the assets such that portfolio beta per factor is the same as for the mispriced asset.

When the investor is long the asset and short the portfolio (or vice versa) he has created a position which has a positive expected return (the difference between asset return and portfolio return) and which has a net zero exposure to any macroeconomic factor and is therefore risk free (other than for firm specific risk). The arbitrageur is thus in a position to make a risk-free profit:

Where today's price is too low: The implication is that at the end of the period the portfolio would have appreciated at the rate implied by the APT, whereas the mispriced asset would have appreciated at more than this rate. The arbitrageur could therefore: Today: 1 short sell the portfolio 2 buy the mispriced asset with the proceeds. At the end of the period: 1 sell the mispriced asset 2 use the proceeds to buy back the portfolio 3 pocket the difference.	Where today's price is too high: The implication is that at the end of the period the portfolio would have appreciated at the rate implied by the APT, whereas the mispriced asset would have appreciated at less than this rate. The arbitrageur could therefore: Today: 1 short sell the mispriced asset 2 buy the portfolio with the proceeds. At the end of the period: 1 sell the portfolio 2 use the proceeds to buy back the mispriced asset 3 pocket the difference.

== Comparison with the capital asset pricing model ==
The APT along with the capital asset pricing model (CAPM) is one of two influential theories on asset pricing. The APT differs from the CAPM in that it is less restrictive in its assumptions, making it more flexible for use in a wider range of application. Thus, it possesses greator explanatory power (as opposed to statistical) for expected asset returns. It assumes that each investor will hold a unique portfolio with its own particular array of betas, as opposed to the identical "market portfolio". In some ways, the CAPM can be considered a "special case" of the APT in that the securities market line represents a single-factor model of the asset price, where beta is exposed to changes in value of the market.

Fundamentally, the CAPM is derived on the premise that all factors in the economy can be reconciled into one factor represented by a market portfolio, thus implying they all have equivalent weight on the asset’s return. In contrast, the APT model suggests that each stock reacts uniquely to various macroeconomic factors and thus the impact of each must be accounted for separately.

A disadvantage of APT is that the selection and the number of factors to use in the model is ambiguous. Most academics use three to five factors to model returns, but the factors selected have not been empirically robust. In many instances the CAPM, as a model to estimate expected returns, has empirically outperformed the more advanced APT.

Additionally, the APT can be seen as a "supply-side" model, since its beta coefficients reflect the sensitivity of the underlying asset to economic factors. Thus, factor shocks would cause structural changes in assets' expected returns, or in the case of stocks, in firms' profitabilities.

On the other side, the capital asset pricing model is considered a "demand side" model. Its results, although similar to those of the APT, arise from a maximization problem of each investor's utility function, and from the resulting market equilibrium (investors are considered to be the "consumers" of the assets).

== Implementation ==
As with the CAPM, the factor-specific betas are found via a linear regression of historical security returns on the factor in question. Unlike the CAPM, the APT, however, does not itself reveal the identity of its priced factors - the number and nature of these factors is likely to change over time and between economies. As a result, this issue is essentially empirical in nature. Several a priori guidelines as to the characteristics required of potential factors are, however, suggested:

1. their impact on asset prices manifests in their unexpected movements and they are completely unpredictable to the market at the beginning of each period
2. they should represent undiversifiable influences (these are, clearly, more likely to be macroeconomic rather than firm-specific in nature) on expected returns and so must be quantifiable with non-zero prices
3. timely and accurate information on these variables is required
4. the relationship should be theoretically justifiable on economic grounds

Chen, Roll and Ross identified the following macro-economic factors as significant in explaining security returns:

- surprises in inflation;
- surprises in GNP as indicated by an industrial production index;
- surprises in investor confidence due to changes in default premium in corporate bonds;
- surprise shifts in the yield curve.

As a practical matter, indices or spot or futures market prices may be used in place of macro-economic factors, which are reported at low frequency (e.g. monthly) and often with significant estimation errors. Market indices are sometimes derived by means of factor analysis. More direct "indices" that might be used are:

- short-term interest rates;
- the difference in long-term and short-term interest rates;
- a diversified stock index such as the S&P 500 or NYSE Composite;
- oil prices
- gold or other precious metal prices
- Currency exchange rates

== International arbitrage pricing theory ==
International arbitrage pricing theory (IAPT) is an important extension of the base idea of arbitrage pricing theory which further considers factors such as exchange rate risk. In 1983 Bruno Solnik created an extension of the original arbitrage pricing theory to include risk related to international exchange rates hence making the model applicable international markets with multi-currency transactions. Solnik suggested that there may be several factors common to all international assets, and conversely, there may be other common factors applicable to certain markets based on nationality.

Fama and French originally proposed a three-factor model in 1995 which, consistent with the suggestion from Solnik above suggests that integrated international markets may experience a common set of factors, hence making it possible to price assets in all integrated markets using their model. The Fama and French three factor model attempts to explain stock returns based on market risk, size, and value.

A 2012 paper aimed to empirically investigate Solnik’s IAPT model and the suggestion that base currency fluctuations have a direct and comprehendible effect on the risk premiums of assets. This was tested by generating a returns relation which broke down individual investor returns into currency and non-currency (universal) returns. The paper utilised Fama and French’s three factor model (explained above) to estimate international currency impacts on common factors. It was concluded that the total foreign exchange risk in international markets consisted of the immediate exchange rate risk and the residual market factors. This, along with empirical data tests validates the idea that foreign currency fluctuations have a direct effect on risk premiums and the factor loadings included in the APT model, hence, confirming the validity of the IAPT model.

== See also ==
- Beta coefficient
- Capital asset pricing model
- Carhart four-factor model
- Cost of capital
- Earnings response coefficient
- Efficient-market hypothesis
- Fama–French three-factor model
- Fundamental theorem of arbitrage-free pricing
- Investment theory
- Modern portfolio theory
- Post-modern portfolio theory
- Rational pricing § Shares
- Risk factor (finance)
- Roll's critique
- Value investing
