= Style analysis =

Fashion consultation

In fashion, style analysis is often offered in conjunction with color analysis by professionals such as image consultants or style consultants. A style consultation differs from a color analysis as it considers the body shape of an individual and results in the recommendation of specific shapes and styles of clothes that will suit the individual's body shape, style preferences, work environment and leisure pursuits.
