= Momentum investing =

System of trading stocks based on recent performance

Momentum investing is a system of buying stocks or other securities that have had high returns over the past three-to-twelve months, and selling those that have had poor returns over the same period.

While momentum investing is well-established as a phenomenon, no consensus exists about the explanation for this strategy, and economists have trouble reconciling momentum with the efficient market hypothesis and random walk hypothesis. Two main hypotheses have been submitted to explain the momentum effect in terms of an efficient market. In the first, it is assumed that momentum investors bear significant risk for assuming this strategy, and, therefore, the high returns are a compensation for the risk. Momentum strategies often involve disproportionately trading in stocks with high bid–ask spreads; thus, it is important to take transactions costs into account when evaluating momentum profitability. The second theory assumes that momentum investors are exploiting behavioral shortcomings in other investors, such as investor herding, investor over- and underreaction, disposition effects, and confirmation bias.

Seasonal or calendar effects may help to explain some of the reason for success in the momentum investing strategy. If a stock has performed poorly for months leading up to the end of the year, investors may decide to sell their holdings for tax purposes causing for example the January effect. Increased supply of shares in the market drive its price down, causing others to sell. Once the reason for tax selling is eliminated, the stock's price tends to recover.

== History ==
Researchers have identified persistent momentum trends in stock markets as far back as the Victorian era (c. 1830s to 1900). Richard Driehaus (1942—2021) is sometimes considered the father of momentum investing, but the strategy can be traced back before Richard Donchian (1905-1993), whose investing career began in the 1930s. The strategy takes exception with the old stock market adage of buying low and selling high. According to Driehaus, "far more money is made buying high and selling at even higher prices."

In the late 2000s, as computer and networking speeds increased each year, there were many sub-variants of momentum investing being deployed in the markets by computer-driven models. Some of these operate on a very small time scale, such as high-frequency trading, which often execute dozens or even hundreds of trades per second.

Although this is a reemergence of an investing style that was prevalent in the 1990s, ETFs for this style began trading in 2015.

== Performance of momentum strategies ==
In a study in 1993, Narasimhan Jegadeesh and Sheridan Titman reported that application of this strategy (buying stocks with recent strong performance and selling those with poor performance) gives average returns of 1% per month for the following 3–12 months, but any increased outperformance tends to fade after 12 months and "dissipate" after about 24 months. This finding has been confirmed by many other academic studies, some using data from the 19th century.

Turnover tends to be high for momentum strategies, which could reduce the net returns of a momentum strategy. Some even claim that transaction costs wipe out momentum profits. In their 2014 study "Fact, Fiction and Momentum Investing", Cliff Asness and his co-authors address 10 issues with regards to momentum investing, including transaction costs.

The performance of momentum comes with the increased risk of occasional large crashes and major losses. For example, in 2009, momentum experienced a crash of -73.42% in three months, substantially more than the broad market. A 2011 paper proposed this problem with momentum can be reduced with a so-called residual momentum strategy in which only the stock-specific part of momentum is used.

A momentum strategy can also be applied across industries and across markets.

Writing in Kiplinger in 2024, Kim Clark notes the growing popularity of exchange traded funds or other investment vehicles marketed as using momentum strategies, but also warns there is no universal definition of the concept and each investment firm uses a different version of momentum which can have radically different performance or holdings. Clark also quotes and summarizes comments from Amy Arnott of Morningstar Inc: "Momentum is actually one of the more puzzling and risky investing strategies in common use. 'The tricky thing with momentum is that it works until it doesn’t. During turning points, momentum funds really struggle,' [Arnott] says."

== Explanation ==
In capital market theory, the momentum factor is one of the most well-known market anomalies. In studies, it has been observed that securities that have risen in recent months tend to continue to do so for a few more months. Depending on which past period was taken as a reference and how long the securities were held thereafter, a different magnitude of effect was observed. The same applies in reverse for securities that have recently fallen in value. One explanation is the so-called post-earnings announcement drift, which assumes that investors initially do not fully price in the higher enterprise value after the announcement of better-than-expected earnings figures. The share price only rises gradually with a delay until the true higher value is only reached after a few months.

Since past price information hereby provides information about future developments and a profitable strategy can be generated from it, the momentum factor is in contradiction to the weak market efficiency. So-called momentum crashes, which usually occur in recovery phases after financial market crashes, are considered to be a risk-based explanation. Most alternative explanations come from behavioral finance.

== See also ==
- Behavioral economics
- Carhart four-factor model
- Factor investing
- Investment style
- Low-volatility investing
- Market anomaly
- Momentum (finance)
- Trend following
- Value investing
- Post-earnings-announcement-drift
