= Sector rotation =

Theory of stock market trading patterns

Sector rotation is a theory of stock market trading patterns.

In this context, a sector is understood to mean a group of stocks representing companies in similar lines of business. The basic premise is that these stocks can be expected to perform similarly. Additionally, different groups of stocks which have been clustered according to the aforementioned principle will show differing performance.

Sector rotation theory says a number of things. First, whichever sector is hot (has done well recently) should continue to outperform. Second, these sectors will eventually rotate so that whatever was once out of favor will be in favor. Third, these movements are somewhat predictable, and connected with the business cycle.

With the phase-shift in the performance cycle of sectors (ideally like the phase-shifted wave patterns of three-phase electric power) an investor could continually hop from a sector at the peak of performance to a sector showing a potential to rise.

A sector rotation investment strategy is not a passive investment strategy like indexing, and requires periodic review and adjustment of sector holdings. Tactical asset allocation and sector rotation strategies require patience and discipline, but have the potential to outperform passive indexing investment strategies.

== Examples ==
An investor or trader may describe the current market movements as favoring basic material stocks over semiconductor stocks by calling the environment a sector rotation from semiconductors to basic materials.

An example of a sector clustering would be:

Leading
This includes stocks like consumer cyclicals and financial companies. These would do well when the market is at its bottom.
In-line
This includes stocks like technology and telecommunication. These should outperform the overall market in the main part of a bull market.
Lagging
This includes stocks like energy companies. These would perform well when the market is at its top.
Contrarian
This includes consumer staples. These should perform least badly in a bear market.

Note that the performances mentioned are always relative to the overall market. During a bear market it is expected that all stocks will go down some.

== Connection with other markets ==
The primary driver of sector rotation is the variability of currency values (inflationary, disinflationary, or deflationary) and interest rates. As the economy expands, demand for raw materials creates inflationary pressures, which in turn prompt higher interest rates, which increase the value of the currency, which reduces the competitiveness of a country's exports as the currency causes them to cost more to other countries. This final stage causes the economy to contract, reducing demand for raw materials, which creates deflationary pressures, which in turn prompt lower interest rates, which decrease the value of the currency, which increases the competitiveness of a country's exports—creating a new market cycle. The relative strength of commodities, bonds, currencies, and stocks shift in this changing monetary climate in a somewhat predictable manner.

== See also ==
- Style investing
