= Biblical money management =

Saving advice

Biblical money management is the use of Biblical scripture to provide advice, guidance and principles for money management.

Jesus spoke more about money and material possessions than he did about other topics such as prayer and so there are many parables about them in the New Testament such as the Parable of the Talents and the Parable of the Rich Fool.

== See also ==
- Islamic economics
