= Momentum (finance) =

Term in finance

In finance, momentum is the empirically observed tendency for rising asset prices or securities return to rise further, and falling prices to keep falling. For instance, it was shown that stocks with strong past performance continue to outperform stocks with poor past performance in the next period with an average excess return of about 1% per month. Momentum signals (e.g., 52-week high) have been used by financial analysts in their buy and sell recommendations.

== Overview ==
The existence of momentum is a market anomaly, which finance theory struggles to explain. The difficulty is that an increase in asset prices, in and of itself, should not warrant further increase. Such increase, according to the efficient-market hypothesis, is warranted only by changes in demand and supply or new information (cf. fundamental analysis).

Students of financial economics have largely attributed the appearance of momentum to cognitive biases, which belong in the realm of behavioral economics. The explanation is that investors are irrational, in that they underreact to new information by failing to incorporate news in their transaction prices. However, much as in the case of price bubbles, other research has argued that momentum can be observed even with perfectly rational traders.

== See also ==
- Factor investing
- Carhart four-factor model
- Momentum investing
- Technical analysis
