= P/B ratio =

Financial ratio comparing stock price to company book value

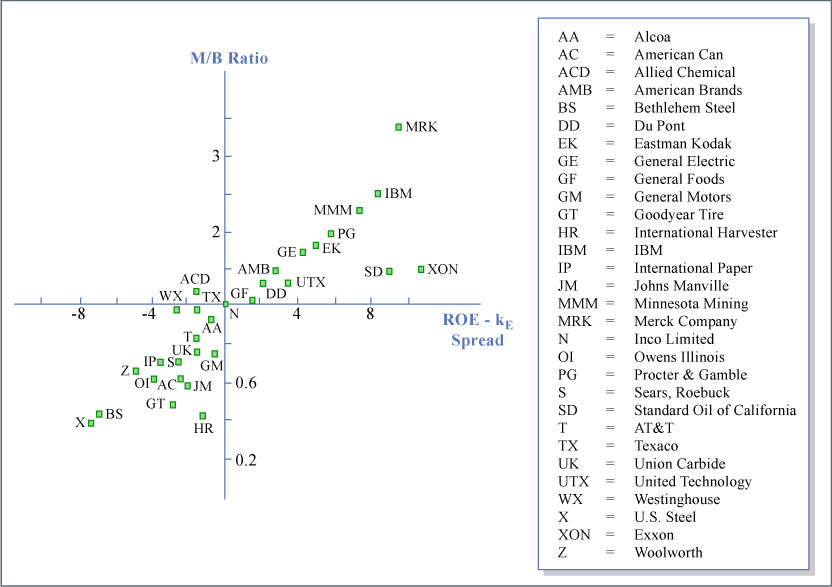
Graph of market-to-book value versus spread for the 30 Dow Jones Industrials (1980).

The price-to-book ratio, or P/B ratio, (also PBR) is a financial ratio used to compare a company's current market value to its book value (where book value is the value of all assets minus liabilities owned by a company). The calculation can be performed in two ways, but the result should be the same. In the first way, the company's market capitalization can be divided by the company's total book value from its balance sheet. The second way, using per-share values, is to divide the company's current share price by the book value per share (i.e. its book value divided by the number of outstanding shares). It is also known as the market-to-book ratio and the price-to-equity ratio (which should not be confused with the price-to-earnings ratio), and its inverse is called the book-to-market ratio.

As with most ratios, it varies a fair amount by industry. Industries that require more infrastructure capital (for each dollar of profit) will usually trade at P/B ratios much lower than, for example, consulting firms. P/B ratios are commonly used to compare banks, because most assets and liabilities of banks are constantly valued at market values. A higher P/B ratio implies that investors expect management to create more value from a given set of assets, all else equal (and/or that the market value of the firm's assets is significantly higher than their accounting value). P/B ratios do not, however, directly provide any information on the ability of the firm to generate profits or cash for shareholders.

This ratio also gives some idea of whether an investor is paying too much for what would be left if the company went bankrupt immediately. For companies in distress, the book value is usually calculated without the intangible assets that would have no resale value. In such cases, P/B should also be calculated on a "diluted" basis, because stock options may well vest on sale of the company or change of control or firing of management.

== Total book value vs tangible book value ==
Technically, P/B can be calculated either including or excluding intangible assets and goodwill. When intangible assets and goodwill are excluded, the ratio is often specified to be "price to tangible book value" or "price to tangible book". See also Return on tangible equity.

== Applications and limitations ==
Despite the limitations of the price-book ratio, academic research has repeatedly shown that stocks with low price-book ratios tend to outperform stocks with high price-book ratios in the United States and other nations. Eugene Fama and Kenneth French incorporated a price-book term in their influential three factor model. Penman Richardson and Tuna (2013) show how the price-to-book ratio can be decomposed into financing and operating components. Foye and Mramor (2016) show that while stocks with low price-book ratios normally outperform, the ratios decomposed elements exhibit a different relationship with returns in different countries, implying that the price-book ratio may have a country-specific interpretation.

== See also ==
- Tobin's q
