= Market anomaly =

Price predictability unexpected by theory

A market anomaly in a financial market is predictability that seems to be inconsistent with (typically risk-based) theories of asset prices. Standard theories include the capital asset pricing model and the Fama-French Three Factor Model, but a lack of agreement among academics about the proper theory leads many to refer to anomalies without a reference to a benchmark theory (Daniel and Hirschleifer 2015 and Barberis 2018, for example). Indeed, many academics simply refer to anomalies as "return predictors", avoiding the problem of defining a benchmark theory.

Academics have documented more than 150 return predictors (see List of Anomalies Documented in Academic Journals). These "anomalies", however, come with many caveats. Almost all documented anomalies focus on illiquid, small stocks. Moreover, the studies do not account for trading costs. As a result, many anomalies do not offer profits, despite the presence of predictability. Additionally, return predictability declines substantially after the publication of a predictor, and thus may not offer profits in the future. Finally, return predictability may be due to cross-sectional or time-variation in risk, and thus does not necessarily provide a good investment opportunity. Relatedly, return predictability by itself does not disprove the efficient market hypothesis, as one needs to show predictability over and above that implied by a particular model of risk.

The four primary explanations for market anomalies are (1) mispricing, (2) unmeasured risk, (3) limits to arbitrage, and (4) selection bias. Academics have not reached a consensus on the underlying cause, with prominent academics continuing to advocate for selection bias, mispricing, and risk-based theories.

Anomalies can be broadly categorized into time-series and cross-sectional anomalies. Time-series anomalies refer to predictability in the aggregate stock market, such as the often-discussed cyclically adjusted price-to-earnings ratio (CAPE) predictor. These time-series predictors indicate times in which it is better to be invested in stocks vs a safe asset (such as Treasury bills). Cross-sectional anomalies refer to the predictable out-performance of particular stocks relative to others. For example, the well-known size anomaly refers to the fact that stocks with lower market capitalization tend to out-perform stocks with higher market capitalization in the future.

== Explanations for anomalies ==
=== Mispricing ===
Many, if not most, of the papers which document anomalies attribute them to mispricing (Lakonishok, Shelifer, and Visny 1994, for example). The mispricing explanation is natural, as anomalies are by definition deviations from a benchmark theory of asset prices. "Mispricing" is then defined as the deviation relative to the benchmark.

The most common benchmark is the CAPM (Capital-Asset-Pricing Model). The deviation from this theory is measured by a non-zero intercept in an estimated security market line. This intercept is commonly denoted by the Greek letter alpha:

$E(R_t-R_{f,t}) = \alpha + \beta[E(R_{M,t} - R_{f,t})]\,$

where $R_t$ is the return on the anomaly, $R_{f,t}$ is the return on the risk-free rate, $\beta$ is the slope from regressing the anomaly's return on the market's return, and $R_{M,t}$ is the return on the "market", often proxied by the return on the CRSP index (an index of all publicly traded U.S. stocks).

The mispricing explanations are often contentious within academic finance, as academics do not agree on the proper benchmark theory (see Unmeasured Risk, below). This disagreement is closely related to the "joint-hypothesis problem" of the efficient market hypothesis.

=== Unmeasured risk ===
Among academics, a common response to claims of mispricing was the idea that the anomaly captures a dimension of risk that is missing from the benchmark theory. For example, the anomaly may generate expected returns beyond those measured using the CAPM regression because the time-series of its returns are correlated with labor income, which is not captured by standard proxies for the market return.

Perhaps the most well-known example of this unmeasured risk explanation is found in Fama and French's seminar paper on their 3-factor model: "if assets are priced rationally, variables that are related to average returns ... ..., must proxy for sensitivity to common (shared and thus undiversifiable) risk factors in returns. The [3-factor model] time-series regressions give direct evidence on this issue."

The unmeasured risk explanation is closely related to the shortcomings of the CAPM as a theory of risk as well as shortcomings of empirical tests of the CAPM and related models. Perhaps the most common critique of the CAPM is that it is derived in a single period setting, and thus is missing dynamic features like periods of high uncertainty. In a more general setting, the CAPM typically implies multiple risk factors, as shown in Merton's Intertemporal CAPM theory. Moreover, the ICAPM generally implies the expected returns vary over time, and thus time-series predictability is not clear evidence of mispricing. Indeed, since the CAPM cannot at all capture dynamic expected returns, evidence of time-series predictability is less often regarded as mispricing as compared to cross-sectional predictability.

Empirical shortcomings primarily regard the difficulty in measuring wealth or marginal utility. Theoretically, wealth includes not only stock market wealth, but also non-tradable wealth like private assets and future labor income. In the consumption CAPM, (which is theoretically equivalent to Merton's ICAPM), the proper proxy for wealth is consumption, which is difficult to measure (Savov 2011, for example).

Despite the theoretical soundness of the unmeasured risk explanation, there is little consensus among academics about the proper risk model over and above the CAPM. Propositions include the well-known Fama-French 3-Factor Model, Fama-French-Carhart 4-factor model, Fama-French 5-factor model, and Stambaugh and Yuan's 4-factor model. These models are all empirically-oriented, rather than derived from a formal theory of equilibrium like Merton's ICAPM.

=== Limits to arbitrage ===
Anomalies are almost always documented using closing prices from the CRSP dataset. These prices do not reflect trading costs, which can prevent arbitrage and thus the elimination predictability. Moreover, almost all anomalies are documented using equally-weighted portfolios, and thus require trading of illiquid (costly-to-trade) stocks.

The limits to arbitrage explanation can be thought of as a refinement of the mispricing framework. A return pattern only offers profits if the returns it offers survives trading costs, and thus should not be considered mispricing unless trading costs are accounted for.

A large literature documents that trading costs greatly reduce anomaly returns. This literature goes back to Stoll and Whaley (1983) and Ball, Kothari, and Shanken (1995). A recent paper that studies dozens of anomalies finds that trading costs have a massive effect on the average anomaly (Novy-Marx and Velikov 2015).

=== Selection bias ===
The documented anomalies are likely the best performers from a much larger set of potential return predictors. This selection creates a bias and implies that estimates of the profitability of anomalies is overstated. This explanation for anomalies is also known as data snooping, p-hacking, data mining, and data dredging, and is closely related to the multiple comparisons problem. Concerns about selection bias in anomalies goes back at least to Jensen and Bennington (1970).

Most research on selection bias in market anomalies focuses on particular subsets of predictors. For example, Sullivan, Timmermann, and White (2001) show that calendar-based anomalies are no longer significant after adjusting for selection bias. A recent meta-analysis of the size premium shows that the reported estimates of the size premium are exaggerated twofold because of selection bias.

Research on selection bias for anomalies more generally is relatively limited and inconclusive. McLean and Pontiff (2016) use an out-of-sample test to show that selection bias accounts for at most 26% of the typical anomaly's mean return during the sample period of the original publication. To show this, they replicate almost 100 anomalies, and show that the average anomaly's return is only 26% smaller in the few years immediately after the end of the original samples. As some of this decline may be due to investor learning effects, the 26% is an upper bound. In contrast, Harvey, Liu, and Zhu (2016) adapt multiple testing adjustments from statistics such as the False Discovery Rate to asset pricing "factors". They refer to a factor as any variable that helps explain the cross-section of expected returns, and thus include many anomalies in their study. They find that multiple-testing statistics imply that factors with t-stats < 3.0 should not be considered statistically significant, and conclude that most published findings are likely false.

== List of anomalies documented in academic journals ==
The small firm effect proposes that small companies outperform larger ones. It has been debated in academic journals as to whether the effect is real or arises due to certain systemic errors.

It is related to the neglected firm effect.

Description	Author(s)	Year	Journal	Broad Category
Change in capital investment, industry adjusted	Abarbanell and Bushee	1998	The Accounting Review	Cross-Sectional
Gross Margin growth over sales growth	Abarbanell and Bushee	1998	The Accounting Review	Cross-Sectional
Proxy Fights	Ikenberry and Lakonishok	1993	Journal of Business	Cross-Sectional
Sales growth over inventory growth	Abarbanell and Bushee	1998	The Accounting Review	Cross-Sectional
Sales growth over overhead growth	Abarbanell and Bushee	1998	The Accounting Review	Cross-Sectional
Operating Cash flows to price	Desai, Rajgopal, and Benkatachalam	2004	The Accounting Review	Cross-Sectional
Earnings Forecast	Elgers, Lo, and Pfeiffer	2001	The Accounting Review	Cross-Sectional
Growth in Long term net operating assets	Fairfield, Whisenant and Yohn	2003	The Accounting Review	Cross-Sectional
Earnings Surprise	Foster, Olsen and Shevliln	1984	The Accounting Review	Cross-Sectional
Percent Operating Accruals	Hafzalla, Lundholm, and Van Winkle	2011	The Accounting Review	Cross-Sectional
Percent Total Accruals	Hafzalla, Lundholm, and Van Winkle	2011	The Accounting Review	Cross-Sectional
Real dirty surplus	Landsman et al.	2011	The Accounting Review	Cross-Sectional
Taxable income to income	Lev and Nissim	2004	The Accounting Review	Cross-Sectional
Piotroski F-score	Piotroski	2000	The Accounting Review	Cross-Sectional
Accruals	Sloan	1996	The Accounting Review	Cross-Sectional
Asset Turnover	Soliman	2008	The Accounting Review	Cross-Sectional
Change in Asset Turnover	Soliman	2008	The Accounting Review	Cross-Sectional
Change in Noncurrent Operating Assets	Soliman	2008	The Accounting Review	Cross-Sectional
Change in Net Working Capital	Soliman	2008	The Accounting Review	Cross-Sectional
Change in Profit Margin	Soliman	2008	The Accounting Review	Cross-Sectional
Profit Margin	Soliman	2008	The Accounting Review	Cross-Sectional
Abnormal Accruals	Xie	2001	The Accounting Review	Cross-Sectional
Earnings Consistency	Alwathainani	2009	British Accounting Review	Cross-Sectional
Deferred Revenue	Prakash and Sinha	2012	Contemporary Accounting Research	Cross-Sectional
Sales-to-price	Barbee, Mukherji, and Raines	1996	Financial Analysts' Journal	Cross-Sectional
earnings / assets	Balakrishnan, Bartov, and Faurel	2010	Journal of Accounting and Economics	Cross-Sectional
Net debt financing	Bradshaw, Richardson, and Sloan	2006	Journal of Accounting and Economics	Cross-Sectional
Net equity financing	Bradshaw, Richardson, and Sloan	2006	Journal of Accounting and Economics	Cross-Sectional
Net external financing	Bradshaw, Richardson, and Sloan	2006	Journal of Accounting and Economics	Cross-Sectional
Net Operating Assets	Hirschleifer, Hou Teoh, and Zhang	2004	Journal of Accounting and Economics	Cross-Sectional
Change in depreciation to gross PPE	Holthausen Larcker	1992	Journal of Accounting and Economics	Cross-Sectional
Change in equity to assets	Richardson, Sloan Soliman and Tuna	2005	Journal of Accounting and Economics	Cross-Sectional
Change in current operating assets	Richardson, Sloan Soliman and Tuna	2005	Journal of Accounting and Economics	Cross-Sectional
Change in current operating liabilities	Richardson, Sloan Soliman and Tuna	2005	Journal of Accounting and Economics	Cross-Sectional
Change in financial liabilities	Richardson, Sloan Soliman and Tuna	2005	Journal of Accounting and Economics	Cross-Sectional
Change in long-term investment	Richardson, Sloan Soliman and Tuna	2005	Journal of Accounting and Economics	Cross-Sectional
Enterprise component of BM	Penman, Richardson, and Tuna	2007	Journal of Accounting Research	Cross-Sectional
Leverage component of BM	Penman, Richardson, and Tuna	2007	Journal of Accounting Research	Cross-Sectional
Net debt to price	Penman, Richardson, and Tuna	2007	Journal of Accounting Research	Cross-Sectional
Change in Taxes	Thomas and Zhang	2011	Journal of Accounting Research	Cross-Sectional
IPO and no R&D spending	Gou, Lev, and Shi	2006	Journal of Business, Finance and Accounting	Cross-Sectional
Change in capex (two years)	Anderson and Garcia-Feijoo	2006	Journal of Finance	Cross-Sectional
Idiosyncratic risk	Ang, Hodrick, Xing, and Zhang	2006	Journal of Finance	Cross-Sectional
Junk Stock Momentum	Avramov, Chordia, Jostova, and Philipov	2007	Journal of Finance	Cross-Sectional
Maximum return over month	Bali, Cakici, and Whitelaw	2010	Journal of Finance	Cross-Sectional
Consensus Recommendation	Barber, Lehavy, McNichols, and Trueman	2001	Journal of Finance	Cross-Sectional
Down forecast EPS	Barber, Lehavy, McNichols, and Trueman	2001	Journal of Finance	Cross-Sectional
Up Forecast	Barber, Lehavy, McNichols, and Trueman	2001	Journal of Finance	Cross-Sectional
Earnings-to-Price Ratio	Basu	1977	Journal of Finance	Cross-Sectional
Price	Blume and Husic	1972	Journal of Finance	Cross-Sectional
Net Payout Yield	Boudoukh, Michaely, Richardson, and Roberts	2007	Journal of Finance	Cross-Sectional
Payout Yield	Boudoukh, Michaely, Richardson, and Roberts	2007	Journal of Finance	Cross-Sectional
Failure probability	Campbell, Hilscher, and Szilagyi	2008	Journal of Finance	Cross-Sectional
Earnings announcement return	Chan, Jegadeesh, and Lakonishok	1996	Journal of Finance	Cross-Sectional
Earnings forecast revisions	Chan, Jegadeesh, and Lakonishok	1996	Journal of Finance	Cross-Sectional
Advertising Expense	Chan, Lakonishok, and Sougiannis	2001	Journal of Finance	Cross-Sectional
R&D over market cap	Chan, Lakonishok, and Sougiannis	2001	Journal of Finance	Cross-Sectional
Asset Growth	Cooper, Gulen and Schill	2008	Journal of Finance	Cross-Sectional
Intangible return	Daniel and Titman	2006	Journal of Finance	Cross-Sectional
Share issuance (5 year)	Daniel and Titman	2006	Journal of Finance	Cross-Sectional
Momentum-Reversal	De Bondt and Thaler	1985	Journal of Finance	Cross-Sectional
Long-run reversal	De Bondt and Thaler	1985	Journal of Finance	Cross-Sectional
Exchange Switch	Dharan Ikenberry	1995	Journal of Finance	Cross-Sectional
Credit Rating Downgrade	Dichev Piotroski	2001	Journal of Finance	Cross-Sectional
EPS Forecast Dispersion	Diether et al.	2002	Journal of Finance	Cross-Sectional
Unexpected R&D increase	Eberhart et al.	2004	Journal of Finance	Cross-Sectional
Organizational Capital	Eisfeldt and Papanikolaou	2013	Journal of Finance	Cross-Sectional
Pension Funding Status	Franzoni and Martin	2006	Journal of Finance	Cross-Sectional
52 week high	George and Hwang	2004	Journal of Finance	Cross-Sectional
Tangibility	Hahn and Lee	2009	Journal of Finance	Cross-Sectional
Industry concentration (Herfindahl)	Hou and Robinson	2006	Journal of Finance	Cross-Sectional
Momentum (12 month)	Jegadeesh and Titman	1993	Journal of Finance	Cross-Sectional
Momentum (6 month)	Jegadeesh and Titman	1993	Journal of Finance	Cross-Sectional
Change in recommendation	Jegadeesh et al.	2004	Journal of Finance	Cross-Sectional
Short term reversal	Jegedeesh	1989	Journal of Finance	Cross-Sectional
Long-term EPS forecast	La Porta	1996	Journal of Finance	Cross-Sectional
Cash flow to market	Lakonishok, Scheifer, and Vishny	1994	Journal of Finance	Cross-Sectional
Revenue Growth Rank	Lakonishok, Scheifer, and Vishny	1994	Journal of Finance	Cross-Sectional
Momentum and Volume	Lee Swaminathan	2000	Journal of Finance	Cross-Sectional
Public Seasoned Equity Offerings	Loughran Ritter	1995	Journal of Finance	Cross-Sectional
Dividend Initiation	Michaely et al.	1995	Journal of Finance	Cross-Sectional
Dividend Omission	Michaely et al.	1995	Journal of Finance	Cross-Sectional
Institutional ownership interactions with anomalies	Nagel	2005	Journal of Finance	Cross-Sectional
Dividend Yield	Naranjo et al.	1998	Journal of Finance	Cross-Sectional
Share issuance (1 year)	Pontiff and Woodgate	2008	Journal of Finance	Cross-Sectional
Initial Public Offerings	Ritter	1991	Journal of Finance	Cross-Sectional
Firm Age - Momentum	Zhang	2004	Journal of Finance	Cross-Sectional
Book to market	Stattman	1980	The Chicago MBA	Cross-Sectional
Bid-ask spread	Amihud and Mendelsohn	1986	Journal of Financial Economics	Cross-Sectional
Institutional Ownership for stocks with high short interest	Asquith, Pathak, and Ritter	2005	Journal of Financial Economics	Cross-Sectional
Cash-based operating profitability	Ball, Gerakos, Linnainmaa, and Nikolaev	2016	Journal of Financial Economics	Cross-Sectional
Size	Banz	1981	Journal of Financial Economics	Cross-Sectional
Market leverage	Bhandari	1988	Journal of Financial Economics	Cross-Sectional
Past trading volume	Brennan, Chordia, and Subrahmanyam	1998	Journal of Financial Economics	Cross-Sectional
Breadth of ownership	Chen Hong Stein	2002	Journal of Financial Economics	Cross-Sectional
Turnover volatility	Chordia, Subrahmanyam, and Anshuman	2001	Journal of Financial Economics	Cross-Sectional
Volume Variance	Chordia, Subrahmanyam, and Anshuman	2001	Journal of Financial Economics	Cross-Sectional
Conglomerate return	Cohen and Lou	2012	Journal of Financial Economics	Cross-Sectional
Spinoffs	Cusatis et al.	1993	Journal of Financial Economics	Cross-Sectional
Short Interest	Dechow, Hutton, Meulbroek, and Sloan	2001	Journal of Financial Economics	Cross-Sectional
O Score	Dichev	1998	Journal of Financial Economics	Cross-Sectional
Altman Z-score	Dichev	1998	Journal of Financial Economics	Cross-Sectional
operating profits / book equity	Fama and French	2006	Journal of Financial Economics	Cross-Sectional
Industry Momentum	Grinblatt Moskowitz	1999	Journal of Financial Economics	Cross-Sectional
Dividends	Hartzmark Salomon	2013	Journal of Financial Economics	Cross-Sectional
net income / book equity	Haugen and Baker	1996	Journal of Financial Economics	Cross-Sectional
Cash-flow variance	Haugen and Baker	1996	Journal of Financial Economics	Cross-Sectional
Volume to market equity	Haugen and Baker	1996	Journal of Financial Economics	Cross-Sectional
Volume Trend	Haugen and Baker	1996	Journal of Financial Economics	Cross-Sectional
Return Seasonality	Heston and Sadka	2008	Journal of Financial Economics	Cross-Sectional
Sin Stock (selection criteria)	Hong Kacperczyk	2009	Journal of Financial Economics	Cross-Sectional
Share repurchases	Ikenberry, Lakonishok and Vermaelen	1995	Journal of Financial Economics	Cross-Sectional
Revenue Surprise	Jegadeesh and Livnat	2006	Journal of Financial Economics	Cross-Sectional
Option Volume relative to recent average	Johnson So	2012	Journal of Financial Economics	Cross-Sectional
Option Volume to Stock Volume	Johnson So	2012	Journal of Financial Economics	Cross-Sectional
Days with zero trades	Liu	2006	Journal of Financial Economics	Cross-Sectional
Intermediate Momentum	Novy-Marx	2012	Journal of Financial Economics	Cross-Sectional
gross profits / total assets	Novy-Marx	2013	Journal of Financial Economics	Cross-Sectional
Cash to assets	Palazzo	2012	Journal of Financial Economics	Cross-Sectional
Debt Issuance	Spiess Affleck-Graves	1999	Journal of Financial Economics	Cross-Sectional
Slope of smile	Yan	2011	Journal of Financial Economics	Cross-Sectional
Amihud's illiquidity	Amihud	2002	Journal of Financial Markets	Cross-Sectional
Share Volume	Datar, Naik, and Radcliffe	1998	Journal of Financial Markets	Cross-Sectional
Enterprise Multiple	Loughran and Wellman	2011	Journal of Financial and Quantitative Analysis	Cross-Sectional
Efficient frontier index	Nguyen Swanson	2009	Journal of Financial and Quantitative Analysis	Cross-Sectional
Investment	Titman, Wei, and Xie	2004	Journal of Financial and Quantitative Analysis	Cross-Sectional
Convertible debt indicator	Valta	2016	Journal of Financial and Quantitative Analysis	Cross-Sectional
Volatility smirk	Xing Zhang Zhao	2010	Journal of Financial and Quantitative Analysis	Cross-Sectional
Stock Splits	Ikenberry, Rankine, Stice	1996	Journal of Financial and Quantitative Analysis	Cross-Sectional
Sustainable Growth	Lockwood Prombutr	2010	Journal of Financial Research	Cross-Sectional
Momentum and LT Reversal	Chan and Kot	2006	Journal of Investment Management	Cross-Sectional
Employment growth	Belo, Lin, and Bazdresch	2014	Journal of Political Economy	Cross-Sectional
CAPM beta squared	Fama and MacBeth	1973	Journal of Political Economy	Cross-Sectional
Number of consecutive earnings increases	Loh Warachka	2012	Management Science	Cross-Sectional
Governance Index	Gompers, Ishii and Metrick	2003	Quarterly Journal of Economics	Cross-Sectional
Change in Forecast and Accrual	Barth and Hutton	2004	Review of Accounting Studies	Cross-Sectional
Excluded Expenses	Doyle et al.	2003	Review of Accounting Studies	Cross-Sectional
Mohanram G-score	Mohanram	2005	Review of Accounting Studies	Cross-Sectional
Order backlog	Rajgopal, Shevlin and Venkatachalam	2003	Review of Accounting Studies	Cross-Sectional
Inventory Growth	Thomas and Zhang	2002	Review of Accounting Studies	Cross-Sectional
Operating Leverage	Novy-Marx	2010	Review of Finance	Cross-Sectional
Decline in Analyst Coverage	Scherbina	2008	Review of Finance	Cross-Sectional
Earnings surprise of big firms	Hou	2007	Review of Financial Studies	Cross-Sectional
Industry return of big firms	Hou	2007	Review of Financial Studies	Cross-Sectional
Price delay	Hou and Moskowitz	2005	Review of Financial Studies	Cross-Sectional
Tail risk beta	Kelly and Jiang	2014	Review of Financial Studies	Cross-Sectional
Kaplan Zingales index	Lamont, Polk, and Saa-Requejo	2001	Review of Financial Studies	Cross-Sectional
Growth in advertising expenses	Lou	2014	Review of Financial Studies	Cross-Sectional
Composite debt issuance	Lyandres, Sun and Zhang	2008	Review of Financial Studies	Cross-Sectional
Real estate holdings	Tuzel	2010	Review of Financial Studies	Cross-Sectional
Book-to-market and accruals	Bartov and Kim	2004	Review of Quantitative Finance and Accounting	Cross-Sectional
Weekend Effect	Smirlock and Starks	1986	Journal of Financial Economics	Time-Series
January effect	Keims	1985	Journal of Financial Economics	Time-Series
Turn of the Month Effect	Agrawal and Tandon	1994	Journal of International Money and Finance	Time-Series

== See also ==
- Neglected firm effect
- Low-volatility anomaly
