= Size premium =

The size premium is the historical tendency for the stocks of firms with smaller market capitalizations to outperform the stocks of firms with larger market capitalizations. It is one of the factors in the Fama–French three-factor model and the Carhart four-factor model.

== See also ==
- Liquidity premium
- Risk premium
- Style investing
