= Kenneth French =

American economist

- Born: March 10, 1954 (age 71); Franklin, New Hampshire, U.S.

Academic work
- Discipline: Financial economics
- School or tradition: Neoclassical economics
- Notable ideas: Fama–French three-factor model
- Website: Information at IDEAS / RePEc

Kenneth Ronald "Ken" French (born March 10, 1954) is the Roth Family Distinguished Professor of Finance at the Tuck School of Business, Dartmouth College. He has previously been a faculty member at MIT, the Yale School of Management, and the University of Chicago Booth School of Business.

He has worked on asset pricing with Eugene Fama. They wrote a series of papers that cast doubt on the validity of the Capital Asset Pricing Model (CAPM), which posits that a stock's beta alone should explain its average return. These papers describe two factors above and beyond a stock's market beta which can explain differences in stock returns: market capitalization and "value". They also offer evidence that a variety of patterns in average returns, often labeled as "anomalies" in past work, can be explained with their Fama–French three-factor model.

== Early life and education ==
French was born in Franklin, New Hampshire. He obtained a B.S. in mechanical engineering from Lehigh University in 1975. He then earned an MBA in 1978, an M.S. in 1981, and a Ph.D. in finance in 1983, all from the University of Rochester. In 2005, French became a Rochester Distinguished Scholar.

== Career ==
French has written for the Journal of Finance, the Journal of Financial Economics, the Review of Financial Studies, the American Economic Review, the Journal of Political Economy, and the Journal of Business, French is also a research associate at the National Bureau of Economic Research, an advisory editor at the Journal of Financial Economics, and a former associate editor of the Journal of Finance, and the Review of Financial Studies.

Professor French was the vice president of the American Finance Association in 2005 and was the organization's president in 2007–8. Also in 2007, Professor French was elected to the American Academy of Arts and Sciences (AAAS).

French is a board member of Dimensional Fund Advisors in Austin, Texas, where he also works as consultant and head of investment policy.
