= Long boom =

Long boom refers to various periods of economic growth, most commonly:

- The post–World War II economic expansion
- The 1990s United States boom
- The mid 1980s–2000s period, contemporary with the Great Moderation
- 1991-2020 Australian economic boom
