= Presidency of Bill Clinton =

1993–2001 U.S. presidential administration

- Official portrait, 1993
- Presidency of Bill Clinton; January 20, 1993 – January 20, 2001
- Vice President: Al Gore
- Cabinet: See list
- Party: Democratic
- Election: 1992; 1996
- Seat: White House
- Seal of the President

Bill Clinton's tenure as the 42nd president of the United States began with his first inauguration on January 20, 1993, and ended on January 20, 2001. Clinton, a Democrat from Arkansas, took office after defeating the Republican incumbent president George H. W. Bush and independent businessman Ross Perot in the 1992 presidential election. Four years later, he won re-election in the 1996 presidential election, after defeating the Republican nominee Bob Dole, and also Perot again (then as the nominee of the Reform Party). Alongside Clinton's presidency, the Democratic Party also held their majorities in the House of Representatives and the Senate during the 103rd U.S. Congress following the 1992 elections, thereby attained an overall federal government trifecta. Clinton was constitutionally limited to two terms (the first re-elected Democrat president to be so) and was succeeded by Republican George W. Bush, who won the 2000 presidential election against Clinton's preferred successor, Vice President Al Gore.

President Clinton oversaw the second longest period of peacetime economic expansion in American history. Months into his first term, he signed the Omnibus Budget Reconciliation Act of 1993, which raised taxes and set the stage for future budget surpluses. He signed the bipartisan Violent Crime Control and Law Enforcement Act and won ratification of the North American Free Trade Agreement, despite opposition from trade unions and environmentalists. Clinton's most ambitious legislative initiative, a plan to provide universal health care, failed to advance through Congress. A backlash to Clinton's agenda sparked the Republican Revolution, with the GOP taking control of the House of Representatives for the first time in 40 years. Clinton pivoted to the center in response by assembling a bipartisan coalition to pass welfare reform, and he successfully expanded health insurance for children.

While Clinton's economy was strong, his presidency oscillated dramatically from high to low and back again, which historian Gil Troy characterized in six Acts. Act I in early 1993 was "Bush League" with amateurish distractions. By mid-1993 Clinton had recovered to Act II, passing a balanced budget and the NAFTA trade deal. Act III, 1994, saw the Republicans mobilizing under Newt Gingrich, defeating Clinton's healthcare reforms, and taking control of the House of Representatives for the first time in forty years. The years 1995 to 1997 saw the comeback in Act IV, with a triumphant reelection landslide in 1996. However, Act V, the Clinton–Lewinsky scandal and impeachment made 1998 a lost year. Clinton concluded happily with Act VI by deregulating the banking system in 1999. In foreign policy, Clinton initiated a bombing campaign in the Balkans, which led to the creation of a United Nations protectorate in Kosovo. He played a major role of the expansion of NATO into former Eastern Bloc countries and remained on positive terms with Russian president Boris Yeltsin. During his second term, Clinton presided over the deregulation of the financial and telecommunications industry. Clinton's second term also saw the first federal budget surpluses since the 1960s. The ratio of debt held by the public to GDP fell from 47.8% in 1993 to 33.6% by 2000. His impeachment in 1998 arose after he denied claims of having an affair with a White House intern, Monica Lewinsky under oath. He was acquitted of all charges by the Senate. He appointed Ruth Bader Ginsburg and Stephen Breyer to the U.S. Supreme Court.

With a 66% approval rating at the time he left office, Clinton had the highest exit approval rating of any president since the end of World War II. Despite the Clinton–Lewinsky scandal and numerous high-profile controversies, historians and political scientists generally rank Clinton as an above-average president.

== 1992 election ==
1992 Electoral College vote results

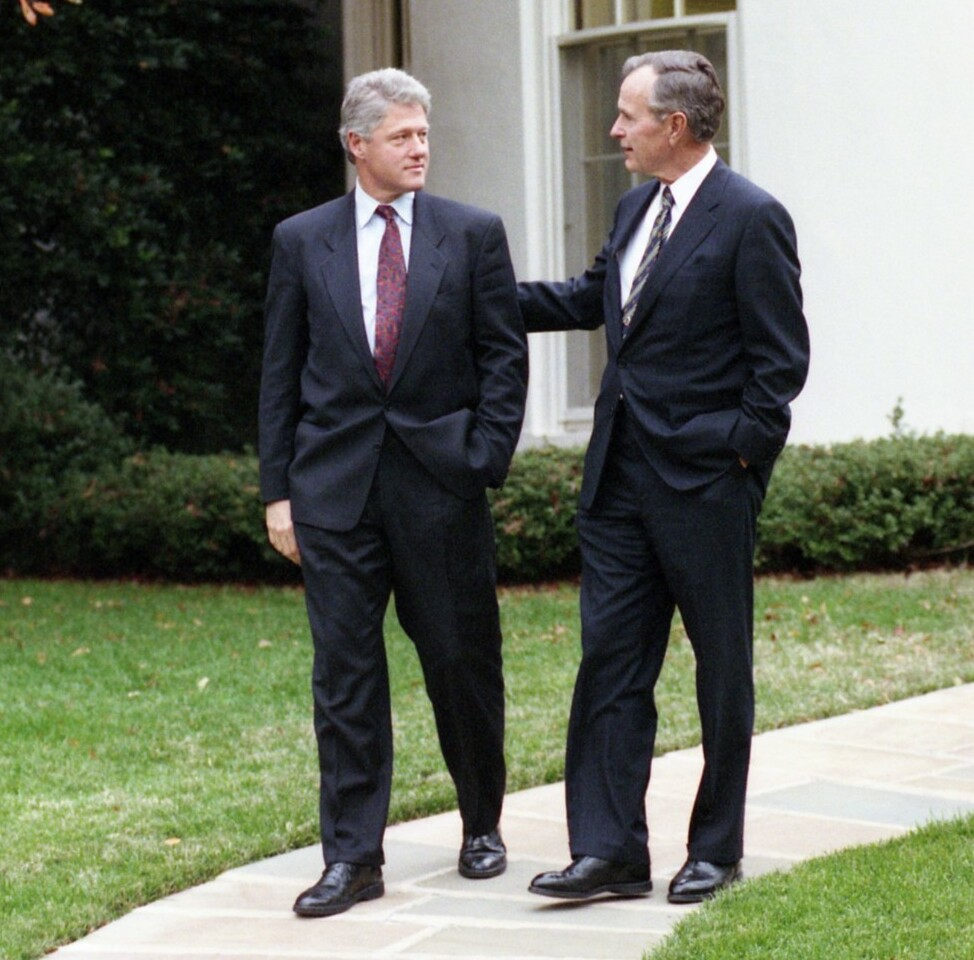
Incumbent president George H. W. Bush and President-elect Clinton on November 18, 1992.

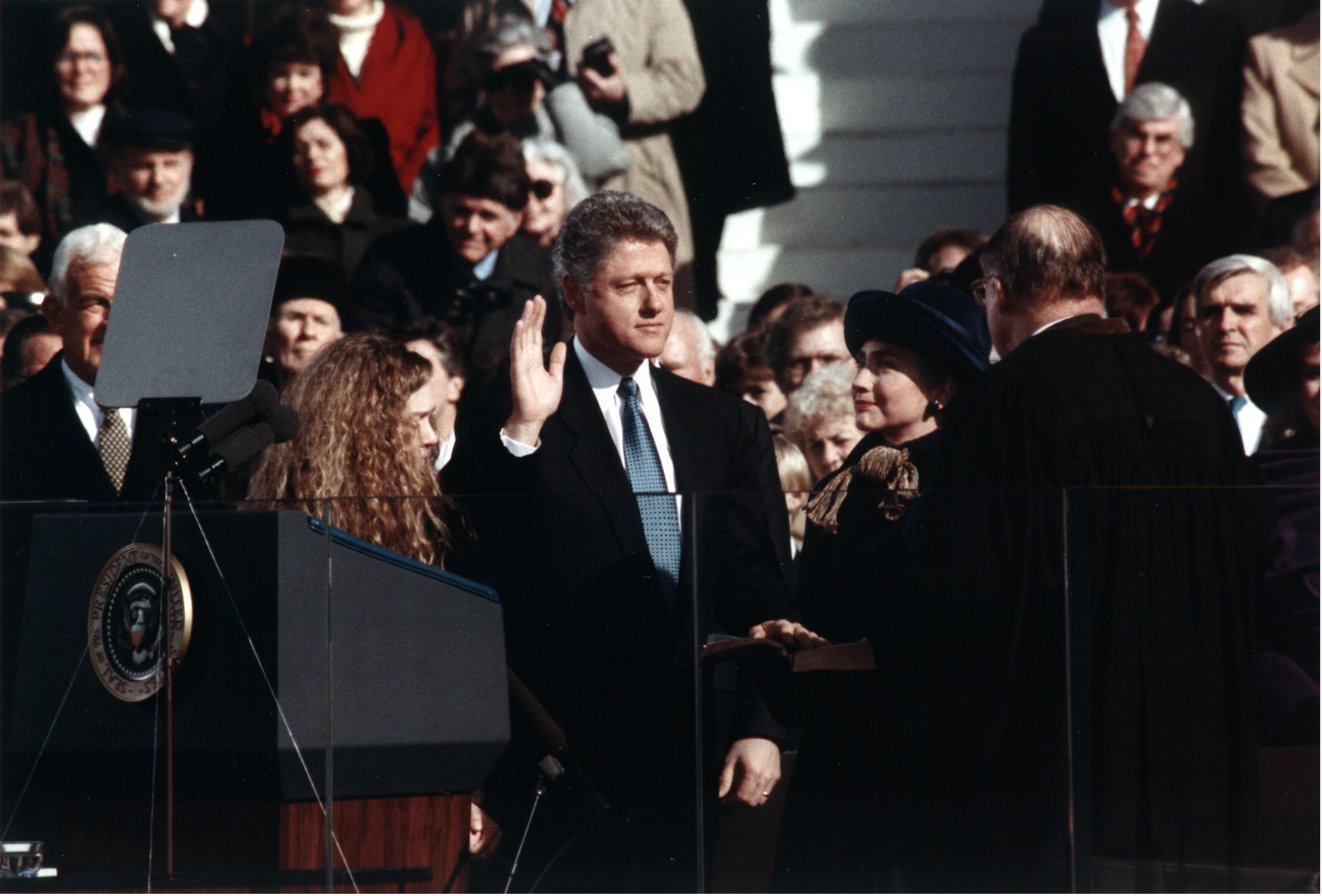
Chief Justice William Rehnquist administers the presidential oath of office to Clinton at the Capitol, January 20, 1993.

President George H. W. Bush's popularity in the aftermath of the successful 1991 Gulf War convinced many prominent Democrats to sit out the 1992 presidential election. With party leaders like Mario Cuomo and Dick Gephardt staying out of the running, the 1992 Democratic primary field consisted of relatively unknown candidates. Among those who sought the Democratic nomination were former senator Paul Tsongas of Massachusetts, former governor Jerry Brown of California, and Bill Clinton, who had served as the governor of Arkansas since 1983. Clinton emerged as the front-runner for the nomination after the first set of primaries in February 1992. A founding member of the centrist Democratic Leadership Council, Clinton overcame opposition from more liberal Democrats like Brown and clinched the Democratic nomination in April 1992.

Bush defeated a challenge from conservative commentator Pat Buchanan to win his party's nomination. Meanwhile, independent candidate Ross Perot, a billionaire businessman from Texas, emerged as a major factor in the race. Perot ran a populist campaign that focused on voters disillusioned with both parties, and he emphasized his opposition to the North American Free Trade Agreement and his desire to balance the federal budget. Polls taken in early June 1992 showed Bush leading the race, followed by Perot and then Clinton. From July to September, Perot temporarily dropped out of the race, causing severe damage to his candidacy. At the 1992 Democratic National Convention, Clinton selected Senator Al Gore of Tennessee as his running mate, and the successful convention helped unify Democrats behind Clinton. While the 1992 Republican National Convention placed a heavy emphasis on social issues, Clinton's campaign focused on the state of the economy, which was still emerging from the early 1990s recession.

On election day, Clinton won 43% of the popular vote and a wide majority in the Electoral College. Bush won 37.4% of the popular vote, while Perot took 18.9%, the strongest showing by a third party or independent presidential candidate since the 1912 election. Later studies showed that Perot drew his voters roughly equally from Clinton and Bush. Clinton's victory included a sweep of the Northeastern United States, and he also won several states in the Midwest, the West, and the South. By far voters' disappointment with the economy was the major favor in voting against the incumbent, with abortion a lesser factor. In the concurrent congressional elections, Democrats secured a government trifecta after retaining their majorities in the House of Representatives and the Senate, and Speaker of the House Tom Foley and Senate Majority Leader George J. Mitchell both remained in their posts. Republicans Robert H. Michel and Bob Dole continued to serve as House Minority Leader and Senate Minority Leader, respectively.

Clinton used his inaugural address to deal with his uncertain mandate from the voters and lack of national experience. He drew heavily upon his lifelong study of the Protestant Bible, his education at Catholic Georgetown University, and the inaugural addresses of Ronald Reagan, Richard Nixon, John Kennedy, Jimmy Carter, and Woodrow Wilson.

== Administration ==
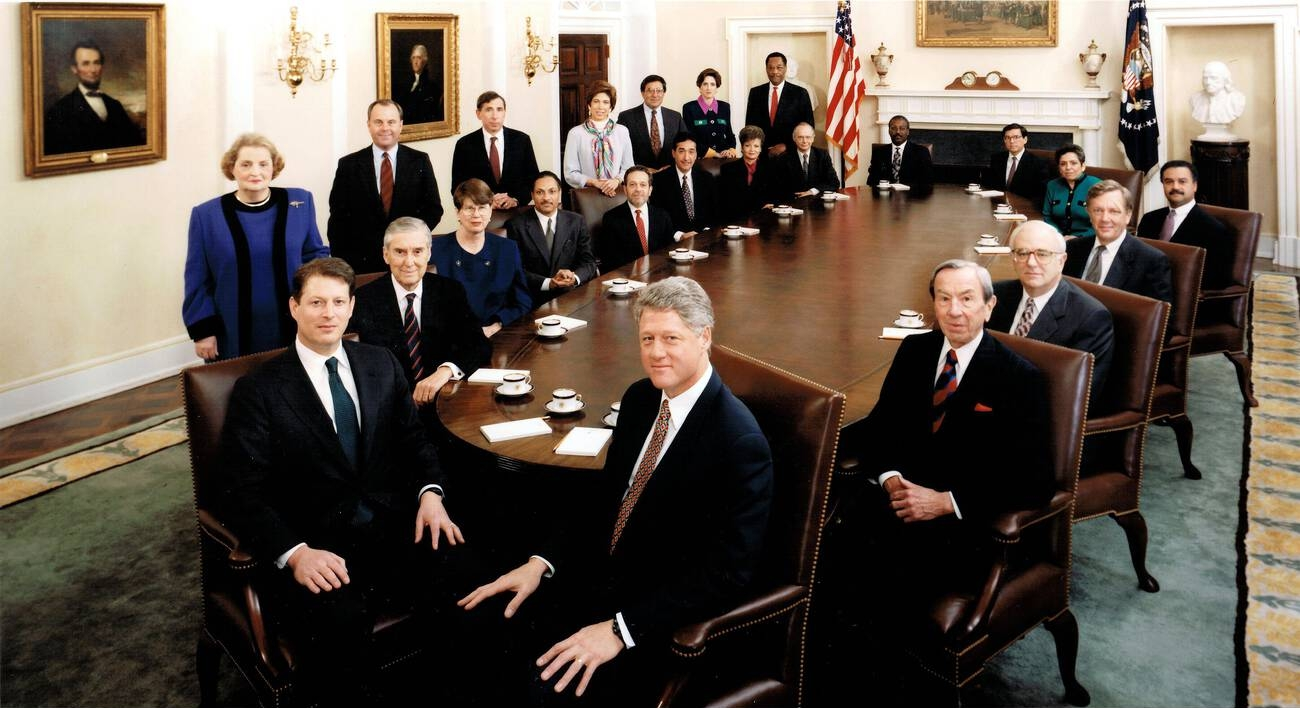
President Bill Clinton and his cabinet in 1993.

Clinton cabinet
Office	Name	Term
President	Bill Clinton	1993–2001
Vice President	Al Gore	1993–2001
Secretary of State	Warren Christopher	1993–1997
Madeleine Albright	1997–2001
Secretary of the Treasury	Lloyd Bentsen	1993–1994
Robert Rubin	1995–1999
Larry Summers	1999–2001
Secretary of Defense	Les Aspin	1993–1994
William Perry	1994–1997
William Cohen	1997–2001
Attorney General	Janet Reno	1993–2001
Secretary of the Interior	Bruce Babbitt	1993–2001
Secretary of Agriculture	Mike Espy	1993–1994
Dan Glickman	1995–2001
Secretary of Commerce	Ron Brown	1993–1996
Mickey Kantor	1996–1997
William M. Daley	1997–2000
Norman Mineta	2000–2001
Secretary of Labor	Robert Reich	1993–1997
Alexis Herman	1997–2001
Secretary of Health and Human Services	Donna Shalala	1993–2001
Secretary of Housing and Urban Development	Henry Cisneros	1993–1997
Andrew Cuomo	1997–2001
Secretary of Transportation	Federico Peña	1993–1997
Rodney Slater	1997–2001
Secretary of Energy	Hazel O'Leary	1993–1997
Federico Peña	1997–1998
Bill Richardson	1998–2001
Secretary of Education	Richard Riley	1993–2001
Secretary of Veterans Affairs	Jesse Brown	1993–1997
Togo West	1998–2000
Hershel Gober (acting)	2000–2001
Administrator of the Environmental Protection Agency	Carol Browner	1993–2001
Director of the Office of Management and Budget	Leon Panetta	1993–1994
Alice Rivlin	1994–1996
Franklin Raines	1996–1998
Jack Lew	1998–2001
Director of Central Intelligence	James Woolsey	1993–1995
John M. Deutch*	1995–1996
George Tenet	1996–2001
United States Trade Representative	Mickey Kantor	1993–1996
Charlene Barshefsky	1996–2001
Ambassador to the United Nations	Madeleine Albright	1993–1997
Bill Richardson	1997–1998
Richard Holbrooke	1999–2001
Chair of the Council of Economic Advisers	Laura Tyson	1993–1995
Joseph Stiglitz	1995–1997
Janet Yellen	1997–1999
Martin N. Baily	1999–2001
Administrator of the Small Business Administration	Erskine Bowles	1993–1994
Philip Lader**	1994–1997
Aida Álvarez	1997–2001
Director of the Federal; Emergency Management Agency	James Witt***	1993–2001
Director of the Office of National Drug Control Policy	Lee Brown	1993–1996
Barry McCaffrey	1996–2001
White House Chief of Staff	Mack McLarty	1993–1994
Leon Panetta	1994–1997
Erskine Bowles	1997–1998
John Podesta	1998–2001
- *Elevated to cabinet-level in May 1995; **Elevated to cabinet-level in October 1994; ***Elevated to cabinet-level in February 1996

Mack McLarty, a long-time friend of Clinton who had led a successful business career and had served as the chairman of the Arkansas Democratic Party, became Clinton's first chief of staff. Clinton convinced Lloyd Bentsen, a longtime Senator from Texas and the 1988 Democratic vice presidential nominee, to serve as his first Secretary of the Treasury. At the start of Clinton's first term, Bentsen, OMB Director Leon Panetta, Secretary of Labor Robert Reich, and policy coordinator Robert Rubin were Clinton's top economic advisers. Clinton's first term foreign policy team was led by National Security Advisor Anthony Lake and Secretary of State Warren Christopher, both of whom had served in the Carter administration. Vice President Gore and First Lady Hillary Clinton emerged as two of the most influential figures of the Clinton administration, and Clinton solicited their opinions on a wide range of issues.

Clinton decided to appoint the first female Attorney General, settling on little-known corporate lawyer Zoë Baird. In what became known as the Nannygate matter, the Senate Judiciary Committee revealed that Baird had hired a Peruvian couple, both undocumented immigrants, to work in her home. Baird withdrew her nomination and Clinton next chose Kimba Wood, who was quickly forced to withdraw due to somewhat similar problems. Janet Reno, a Florida state's attorney, was nominated for Attorney General a few weeks later, and she won confirmation in March 1993. After experiencing difficulty with these nominations, as well as that of Lani Guinier, Clinton brought in David Gergen, who had previously served in Republican administrations, to serve as counselor to the president. Secretary of Defense Les Aspin resigned in the aftermath of the Battle of Mogadishu and was succeeded by William Perry. Bentsen and McLarty also left office in 1994, and they were replaced by Rubin and Panetta, respectively.

After Clinton's re-election, Panetta stepped down and was replaced by former deputy chief of staff Erskine Bowles. Madeleine Albright became the first female secretary of state, Sandy Berger succeeded Lake as National Security Adviser, and former Republican senator William Cohen became the Secretary of Defense. According to reporter John Harris, Berger's close rapport with Clinton made him the leading foreign policy figure of Clinton's second term, as well as the most influential National Security Advisor since Henry Kissinger. John Podesta assumed the position of Chief of Staff in 1998, while Lawrence Summers replaced Rubin as Treasury Secretary in 1999.

== Judicial appointments ==
=== Supreme Court ===
Clinton appointed two justices to the Supreme Court. The first vacancy arose in March 1993, when Associate Justice Byron White informed Clinton of his impending retirement. Clinton considered various nominating political leaders like Mario Cuomo and Secretary of the Interior Bruce Babbitt, whom he believed could become leaders on the court in a similar fashion to Earl Warren. After weeks of consideration, Clinton began to favor appointing an experienced jurist, and he conducted interviews with Stephen Breyer and Ruth Bader Ginsburg, both of whom served as federal appellate judges. Clinton announced Ginsburg's nomination in June 1993 and she was confirmed by the Senate two months later, making her the second woman to serve on the Supreme Court alongside Sandra Day O'Connor. Harry Blackmun retired in 1994, and Clinton successfully nominated Breyer to succeed Blackmun. The appointments did not greatly affect the ideological balance of the Rehnquist Court, as conservatives continued to hold a narrow majority on the Supreme Court.

=== Other courts ===
Clinton also appointed 66 judges to the United States Courts of Appeals and 305 judges to the United States district courts. Among Clinton's appellate appointees were future Supreme Court Justice Sonia Sotomayor, as well as Merrick Garland, who was nominated to the Supreme Court in 2016, though his nomination was never acted on by the Senate. Garland would later go on to become Attorney General under Joe Biden in 2021.

== Domestic affairs ==
=== Budget ===
Clinton proposed a $16 billion stimulus package primarily to aid inner-city programs desired by liberals, but it was defeated by a Republican filibuster in the Senate.

==== Omnibus Budget Reconciliation Act of 1993 ====
Clinton inherited major budget deficits left over from the Reagan and Bush administrations; fiscal year 1992 had seen a $290 billion deficit. In order to cut the deficit, Bentsen, Panetta, and Rubin urged Clinton to pursue both tax increases and spending cuts. They argued that by taming the deficit, Clinton would encourage Federal Reserve Chairman Alan Greenspan to lower interest rates, which, along with increased confidence among investors, would lead to an economic boom. Some of Clinton's advisers also believed that a focus on cutting the deficit would be politically beneficial since it would potentially help Democrats shed their supposed "tax and spend" reputation. Though Secretary of Labor Robert Reich argued that stagnant earnings represented a bigger economic issue than the deficits, Clinton decided to pursue deficit reduction as the major economic priority of his first year in office. In doing so, he reluctantly abandoned a middle-class tax cut that he had championed during the campaign.

Clinton presented his budget plan to Congress in February 1993, proposing a mix of tax increases and spending reductions that would cut the deficit in half by 1997. Republican leaders strongly opposed any tax increase, and they pressured congressional Republicans to unite in opposition to Clinton's budget, and not a single Republican would vote in favor of Clinton's proposed bill. Senate Democrats eliminated the implementation of a new energy tax in favor of an increase in the gasoline tax, but Clinton successfully resisted efforts to defeat his proposed expansion of the earned income tax credit. By narrow margins, the Senate and the House of Representatives both passed versions of Clinton's budget bill, and a conference committee settled the differences between the House and Senate. The House passed the final bill in a 218–216 vote. After intensely lobbying Bob Kerrey and other Democratic senators, Clinton won passage of his bill in the Senate in 50–50 tie vote; Vice President Gore broke the tie. Clinton signed the Omnibus Budget Reconciliation Act of 1993 (OBRA–93) into law on August 10, 1993. The bill provided for $255 billion in spending cuts over a five-year period, with much of those cuts affecting Medicare and the military. It also provided for $241 billion in new revenue over five years; most of that revenue came from an increased gasoline tax or from higher taxes on those who made over $100,000 per year.

==== Government shutdowns ====
After Republicans took control of Congress in the 1994 elections, incoming Speaker of the House Newt Gingrich promised a conservative "revolution" that would implement tax cuts, welfare reform, and major domestic spending cuts. Gingrich failed to deliver major conservative reforms in the first hundred days of the 104th Congress, but many observers continued to wonder if the Speaker would seize stewardship over domestic policy from the office of the president. Meanwhile, with conservatism on the rise and New Deal liberalism in retreat, Clinton hoped to forge a new consensus that did not totally reject government interventionism. In reaction to his party's electoral defeat, Clinton hired consultant Dick Morris, who advocated that Clinton pursue a policy of triangulation between conservative Republicans and liberal Democrats. By co-opting some of Republican ideas, Morris argued that Clinton could boost his own popularity while blocking the possibility of the drastic reforms advocated by some conservatives.

The Republican Congress presented Clinton with a budget plan that cut Medicare spending and instituted major tax cuts for the wealthy, giving him a November 14, 1995, deadline to approve the bill. After the deadline, the government would be forced to temporarily shut down due to a lack of funding. In reaction, Clinton presented his own plan that did not include spending cuts to Medicare but would balance the budget by 2005. As Clinton refused to sign the Republican bill, major portions of the government suspended operations until Congress enacted a stopgap measure. The government shut down again on December 16 after Clinton vetoed a Republican budget proposal that would have extended tax cuts to the wealthy, cut spending on social programs, and shifted control of Medicaid to the states. After a 21-day government shutdown, Republicans, in danger of being seen as extremists by many in the public, accepted Clinton's budget.

==== Line item veto ====
Clinton secured passage of the Line Item Veto Act of 1996, becoming the first president to obtain that power although many had sought it. Its effect was very brief as the act was soon ruled unconstitutional by the Supreme Court in Clinton v. City of New York.

==== Budget surplus ====
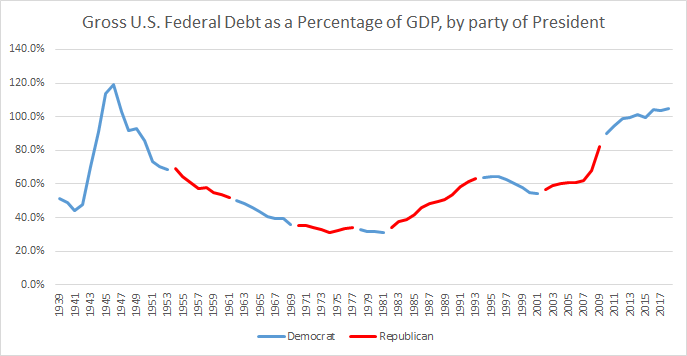
Gross US Federal Debt as a Percentage of GDP, by political party of President

Combined with a strong economy, the 1993 deficit reduction plan produced smaller budget deficits each year. With the improving state of the federal budget, Clinton and congressional Republicans reached a budget agreement in 1997 that provided for relatively small changes to the budget. In 1998, the federal government experienced the first budget surplus since the 1960s. Reflecting the importance of the budget surplus, the New York Times described the end of budget deficits as "the fiscal equivalent of the fall of the Berlin Wall." Though Republican leaders called for large tax cuts in light of the budgetary surplus, Clinton successfully resisted any major budgetary changes in the last three years of his term. In 1997, Clinton agreed to a deal with Republicans that lowered the tax rate on capital gains to 20 percent, implemented a $500 child tax credit, increased funding for children's health care, and raised the federal cigarette tax from 24 cents per pack to 39 cents per pack. Republicans did, however, block some of Clinton's favored policies, including an increase of the federal minimum wage and legislation designed to provide free prescription drugs to seniors.

=== Health care ===
==== 1993 health care plan ====
When Clinton took office, approximately twenty percent of American adults lacked health insurance, despite the fact that the United States spent more on health care than other developed countries. Many liberals advocated the establishment of a single-payer healthcare system similar to that of Canada, while a group of congressional Republicans developed a plan consisting of government subsidies and the implementation of a mandate that would require individuals to purchase health insurance. The administration formed a task force, led by First Lady Hillary Clinton, that was charged with creating a plan that would provide for universal health care. Assigning a major policy role to the First Lady was unprecedented and sparked controversy. Rejecting calls for a single-payer system, she proposed a health care plan based on the extension of employer-based health insurance. Individuals not insured by employers would be insured by the government. The plan would also expand the government's regulatory role in a concept known as "managed competition", with the government setting a minimum level of benefits that each plan could provide. Additionally, the plan would prevent insurers from charging different rates to customers based on age and pre-existing conditions.

After winning the passage of OBRA–93 and the ratification of NAFTA in 1993, the president made health care his major area of legislative focus in 1994. Though many corporations supported Clinton's health care proposal in hopes of reducing their own costs, several other groups strongly objected to the plan. Liberals criticized Clinton for not proposing more far-reaching reforms, while conservatives attacked the expansion of government. Interest groups ran ad campaigns alleging that the Clinton health care bill would lead to health care rationing, reduced choices, and increased costs. The Health Insurance Association of America's "Harry and Louise" ad campaign proved especially important in influencing the public against the Clinton health care bill. Meanwhile, Congressmen Newt Gingrich and columnist Bill Kristol convinced congressional Republicans to resist any form of compromise. Clinton's decision not to engage congressional Democrats and moderate Republicans early in 1993, and his own refusal to compromise on various aspects of the bill, further damaged any hope of passing a major health care bill. With Republicans unified against his plan, and with his own party divided, Clinton decided to abandon health care reform in September 1994.

==== Other health care legislation ====
Within a month of taking office, Clinton signed the Family and Medical Leave Act of 1993. The act, which had been vetoed twice by Bush, guaranteed workers up to 12 weeks of unpaid medical leave for certain medical and family reasons, including pregnancy.

In August 1996, Clinton signed the Health Insurance Portability and Accountability Act. The bipartisan bill granted people the right to keep their insurance plan if they changed jobs, and also contained several other health care reforms. In October 1996, Senator Ted Kennedy introduced a bill to provide health care coverage for children of the working poor, to be financed via a 75 cents a pack cigarette tax increase. Working with Clinton and Republican senator Orrin Hatch, Kennedy won passage of the Children's Health Insurance Program, which in turn was designed by Hillary Clinton, as a section of the Balanced Budget Act of 1997.

==== Health care proposals ====
On January 6, 1998, Clinton unveiled a plan to expand Medicare so that it functioned as a "buy-in" program for early retirees, displaced workers and workers who lost their employer-based health insurance coverage, who are over fifty-five years of age but under the sixty-five year age requirement for standard Medicare coverage. People aged 62-64 would be able to pay a fixed premium of an estimated $300 per month for Medicare insurance under this plan, while laid-off workers and workers who lost employer-based insurance would be able to purchase Medicare coverage if they are between 55-62 years of age, although they would have to pay the full premium. Early retirees could still purchase health insurance coverage through their former jobs until they are old enough to receive Medicare, compared to only for eighteen months under the Consolidated Omnibus Budget Reconciliation Act of 1985.

However, this plan was met with chilly reception from congressional Republicans, who believed that it would be too expensive to administer, and that it was a part of a stepwise plan to enact his failed universal healthcare agenda without explicit congressional approval, among other questions about Medicare's long-term solvency.

==== Other health care policies ====
In the eight years before Clinton took office, the National Institutes of Health spent an average of $9 billion a year, but under Clinton Congress boosted NIH funding by 40 percent to average $12.7 billion annually. By 2000 federal NIH funding had surpassed $15 billion a year, a 50% increase over NIH spending when Clinton first took office or an increase of nearly 37% in inflation-adjusted terms, and the highest level of research funding ever spent on research on health and disease.

=== Welfare reform ===
The successful passage of welfare reform in the 1990s was President Clinton's strategy of "triangulation"-purposely positioning himself midway between liberal Democrats and conservative Republicans, thereby building a majority coalition and enabling him to take full credit for the results.

Shortly after the end of the government shutdown, Clinton announced his plan to pursue major changes to the Aid to Families with Dependent Children (AFDC) program, which provided financial assistance to low-income families with children. Clinton believed that the program inadvertently trapped many poor families and individuals in a cycle of poverty, an argument shared by many Democrats, and he favored shifting funding from AFDC to job training and child care programs. Republicans shared Clinton's goal of making major changes to the welfare system, but they were unwilling to fund the job training programs and wanted to prevent legal immigrants from receiving welfare benefits. Clinton twice vetoed Republican plans that terminated AFDC, with one of these plans, H.R. 4, being vetoed because he believed that it failed to provide adequate protections for child care and healthcare, and provided little incentive for states to move welfare recipients to work, while capping year-over-year federal funding increases for nutritional assistance programs through SNAP. These issues were resolved after months of negotiation, though he wasn't satisfied with the end-product however; despite being more conservative than what he desired, he ultimately decided that he favored the Republican reform plan over no reform at all, and a third veto would've been politically damaging in an election season dominated by a theme of welfare reform.

In July 1996, after months of renegotiation, Clinton signed the Personal Responsibility and Work Opportunity Act, which terminated AFDC. In its place, the bill created the Temporary Assistance for Needy Families (TANF) program, which imposed new work requirements for and lifetime limits on aid recipients, and shifted responsibility for the administration of the programs to the states. Due in part to the improving economy and the expansion of the earned income tax credit, the number of Americans receiving cash public assistance declined from 12.2 million in 1996 to 5.3 million in 2001.

Commentators have sometimes speculated that Clinton's emphasis on entrepreneurship and the post-industrial sector was the co-option of conservative ideas first presented by Reagan Republicans in the 1980s. However Brent Cebul argues that triangulation represented a traditional liberal effort to structure the economy with the goals of creating new jobs, and producing fresh tax revenues that can support progressive policy innovations. This tradition goes back to the local and state policies inspired by the New Deal, and the "supply-side liberalism" of the 1970s.

==== Other welfare ====
In 1993 substantive changes were made to food stamps while the HUD Demonstration Act of 1993 authorized several demonstrations, including "an Innovative Homeless Initiatives Demonstration program, the section 8 pension fund demonstration, and the NCDI program."

In 1993, AmeriCorps was established, a community service program that provided young people with an opportunity to serve their communities and earn money for college or skills training. In just five years, nearly 200,000 young people were enrolled in the program.

In 1997, a child tax credit was introduced that directly reduced a family's income tax bill by $500 per eligible child. In addition, federal funding for the Head Start program rose from $3.3 billion (in constant 2000 dollars) to $5.3 billion in 2000.

A Direct Student Loan Program was introduced, along with an Early Head Start program for children aged 0 to 3 and a Community Development Financial Institutions (CDFI) Fund to support both specialized financial institutions and traditional banks serving lower-income communities. In addition, the Medicare Benefit Package was expanded.

Federal funding for child care was also expanded through his two terms. The Personal Responsibility and Work Opportunity Reconciliation Act authorized an additional $4 billion in child care subsidies over six years on top of what would be authorized ordinarily by Congress, and consolidated and reorganized then-existent federal child care programs into a simplified and more accessible system. In 1998, Clinton proposed a plan that would expand the Child and Dependent Care Credit to cover a portion of families' child care expenses up to an income limit of 200% above the federal poverty line, administer a tax break of up to $150,000 for businesses that provide child care, increase Child Care and Development Block Grant funding to $5 billion per year by 2003, double the number of children eligible for early Head Start programs, and increase funding for the Department of Education's before- and after-school program from an annual funding of $40 million in 1998 to $200 million.

The earned income tax credit was expanded to give a larger benefit to working families and allow childless workers to benefit as well. In 1996, Congress passed a 20% increase in the minimum wage from $4.25 to $5.15, which boosted earnings for nearly 10 million Americans. Clinton also unsuccessfully petitioned Congress to pass another minimum wage hike in 2000.

As part of the Clinton Administration's welfare reforms, over 200,000 people on welfare received housing vouchers to help them move closer to jobs, while a welfare-to-work tax credit encouraged businesses to hire long-term welfare recipients. In addition, communities received federal support to design transportation solutions to help low-income workers get to work.

Better nutritional support was provided for low-income families, with Congress (under Clinton's watch) increasing federal support for several critical nutritional and housing support programs.

=== Anti-drug strategy ===
In February 1993, Clinton slashed 84 percent of staff at the Office of National Drug Control Policy, resulting in the staff size being reduced from 146 to 24. Chief of Staff Thomas F. "Mack" McLarty afterwards stated that "President Clinton believes that resources to fight the drug problem should go to education, to treatment and to enforcement at the state and local level."

=== Economy ===
Federal finances and GDP during Clinton's presidency
Fiscal year	Receipts	Outlays	Surplus/ deficit	GDP	Debt as a % of GDP
1993	1,154.3	1,409.4	−255.1	6,775.3	47.9
1994	1,258.6	1,461.8	−203.2	7,176.9	47.8
1995	1,351.8	1,515.7	−164.0	7,560.4	47.7
1996	1,453.1	1,560.5	−107.4	7,951.3	47.0
1997	1,579.2	1,601.1	−21.9	8,451.0	44.6
1998	1,721.7	1,652.5	69.3	8,930.8	41.7
1999	1,827.5	1,701.8	125.6	9,479.4	38.3
2000	2,025.2	1,789.0	236.2	10,117.5	33.7
2001	1,991.1	1,862.8	128.2	10,526.5	31.5
Ref.					

Budget deficits and surpluses in billions of dollars, 1971–2001

Clinton presided over a "Goldilocks economy", a period of low inflation and low unemployment. During the 1990s, the Dow Jones Industrial Average quadrupled, and the share of families with investments in stocks rose from 32 percent in 1989 to 51 percent in 2001. Income inequality also grew, as the richest households earned a higher proportion of the total income. Nonetheless, median household income, adjusted for inflation to 2000 dollars, grew from $38,262 in 1995 to $42,151 in 2000. By 2000, the unemployment rate had declined to four percent, while the poverty rate had declined to 11.3 percent.

David Greenberg, a professor of history and media studies at Rutgers University, argued that:

By the end of the Clinton presidency, the numbers were uniformly impressive. Besides the record-high surpluses and the record-low poverty rates, the economy could boast the longest economic expansion in history; the lowest unemployment since the early 1970s; and the lowest poverty rates for single mothers, black Americans, and the aged.

Clinton proposed a $30 billion economic stimulus package in his first year in office, but his proposal was blocked by Senate Republicans, and he would be unable to win the passage of any similar proposal for the remainder of his presidency. Clinton held office at a time when monetarism had supplanted Keynesianism as the dominant theory of economic growth among many in Washington. Under the theory of monetarism, Clinton's fiscal policies would have relatively little impact on the economy. Instead, monetarists contended that the economy was guided by the Federal Reserve Board of Governors, a group of appointed officials who set monetary policy. Throughout Clinton's presidency, Alan Greenspan served as the chairman of the Federal Reserve, and he emerged as an especially prominent public figure as the economy improved in mid-to-late 1990s. Though much of the credit for the strong economy was assigned to Greenspan, the Clinton administration also basked in the approval of Americans who enjoyed the benefits of a strong economy, and good economic conditions helped Clinton remain popular despite controversies over his personal life.

=== Deregulation ===
Clinton presided over a period of deregulation in the telecommunications and financial industries. In 1999, Clinton signed into law the Gramm–Leach–Bliley Act (GLBA). The act repealed a provision of the New Deal's Glass–Steagall Act of 1933 that had required banks to either classify themselves as either commercial bank, which were subject to federal oversight and protections like deposit insurance, or as investment banks, which faced less regulations but did not benefit from federal protections. The financial services industry had attempted to repeal this provision of the GLBA since the 1980s, and they were finally successful due to cooperation from Secretary of the Treasury Rubin and Clintonians, who believed that the financial industry needed looser regulation in order for it to remain competitive globally. The bill passed both houses of Congress with only minimal resistance. Opposition to the plan came primarily from liberals like Senator Paul Wellstone, who feared that looser banking regulations would lead to financial crises.

Shortly before leaving office, Clinton signed the Commodity Futures Modernization Act of 2000, which deregulated trading of derivatives. The bill also included the "Enron loophole", which lessened regulation of energy trading by companies such as Enron. Clinton also signed the Telecommunications Act of 1996, which represented the first major overhaul of the Communications Act of 1934.

=== Gay rights ===
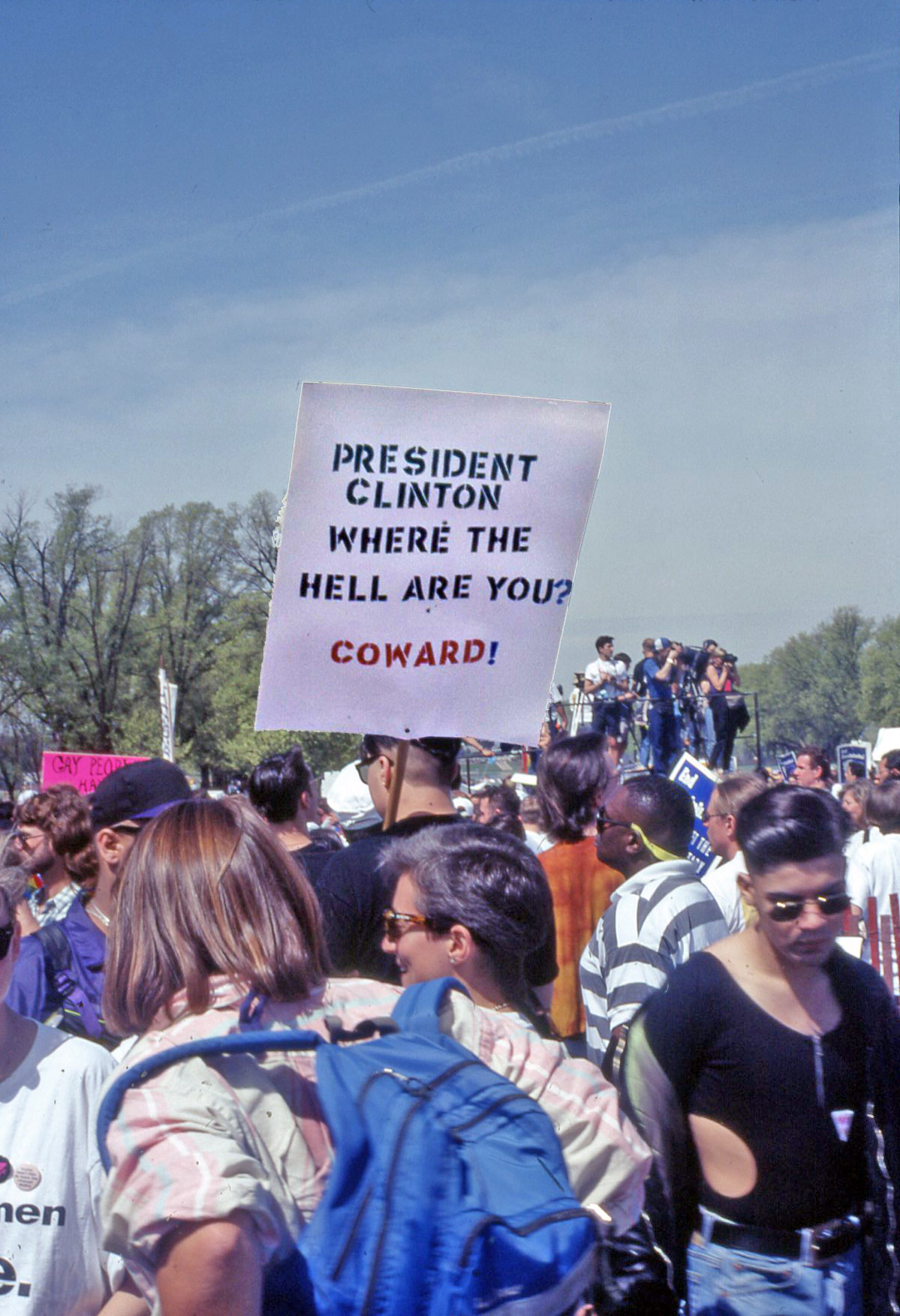
Sign reading "President Clinton, where the hell are you? Coward!" at the March on Washington for Lesbian, Gay and Bi Equal Rights and Liberation, 1993

Clinton supported the right of homosexual individuals to serve in the military, and, along with Secretary of Defense Les Aspin, he developed a plan that would allow openly gay individuals to serve in the military. Clinton's proposal received strong pushback from military leaders, especially Marine Commandant Carl Epting Mundy Jr. In response, General Colin Powell suggested a compromise solution in which the military would not ask recruits about their sexual orientation, but would retain the right to discharge those who were gay. Clinton resisted the compromise policy, which became known as "don't ask, don't tell", but congressional leaders of both parties made it clear that they would reverse any executive order allowing gay individuals to openly serve in the military. Clinton ultimately accepted the don't ask, don't tell policy, and over the ensuing ten years approximately 10,000 people were discharged from the military after they revealed their homosexuality. In September 1996, Clinton signed the Defense of Marriage Act, which denied federal recognition to same-sex marriages, though it had passed with a veto-proof majority and he called the law unnecessary and divisive.

=== Abortion ===
On taking office, Clinton revoked a gag order that had prevented abortion counseling in federally funded clinics. He also signed an executive order allowing the use of fetal tissue in medical research. These early policies moves signaled Clinton's break with the socially conservative policies of his predecessors. Clinton also signed the Freedom of Access to Clinic Entrances Act, which made it a federal crime to obstruct abortion clinics and places of worship. In April 1996, Clinton vetoed a bill to prohibit late or partial birth abortion calling the procedure potentially life-saving and arguing that the small group of women likely to be affected should not become pawns. Catholic bishops condemned his move. Clinton vetoed another such law in 1997. Republicans later passed the Partial-Birth Abortion Ban Act, which was signed by President George W. Bush in 2003.

In October 1996, Clinton signed into law the Amber Hangerman Child Protection Act, which created the child abduction Amber alert system for news stations and the national sex offender registry.

=== Firearms ===
In November 1993, Clinton signed the Brady Handgun Violence Prevention Act, which required a background check for gun purchasers. In 1994, Clinton signed the Violent Crime Control and Law Enforcement Act, which included a provision known as the Federal Assault Weapons Ban. The Violent Crime Control and Law Enforcement Act provided funding for 100,000 local law enforcement officials, and established a federal three-strikes law that enhanced criminal penalties for repeat offenders. The Federal Assault Weapons Ban barred the sale of several kinds of semi-automatic rifles, but the provision did not apply to the 1.5 million semi-automatic rifles already in the possession of private owners, nor did it affect other types of guns.

=== Environmentalism ===
Liberal Democrats gave environmentalism a higher priority than the economy-focused Clinton did. The Clinton administration responded to public demand for environmental protection. Clinton created 17 national monuments by executive order, prohibiting commercial activities such as logging, mining, and drilling for oil or gas. Clinton also imposed a permanent freeze on drilling in maritime sanctuaries. Other presidential and departmental orders protected various wetlands and coastal resources and extended the existing moratorium on new oil leases off the coast line through 2013. After the Republican victory in the 1994 elections, Clinton vetoed a series of budget bills that contained amendments designed to scale back environmental restrictions. Clinton boasted that his administration "adopted the strongest air-quality protections ever, improved the safety of our drinking water and food, cleaned up about three times as many toxic waste sites as the two previous administrations combined, [and] helped to promote a new generation of fuel-efficient vehicles and vehicles that run on alternative fuels".

Vice President Gore was keenly concerned with global climate change, and Clinton created the President's Council on Sustainable Development. In November 1998, Clinton signed the Kyoto Protocol, an international agreement in which developed countries committed to reducing carbon emissions. However, the Senate refused to ratify it since the agreement did not apply to the rapidly growing emissions of developing countries, such as China, India, and Indonesia.

The key person on environmental issues was Bruce Babbitt, the former head of the League of Conservation Voters, who served for all eight years as Clinton's Secretary of the Interior. According to John D. Leshy:

His most remembered legacies will likely be his advocacy of environmental restoration, his efforts to safeguard and build support for the ESA (Endangered Species Act of 1973) and the biodiversity that it helps protect, and the public land conservation measures that flowered on his watch.

The Interior Department worked to protect scenic and historic areas of America's federal public lands. In 2000 Babbitt created the National Landscape Conservation System, a collection of 15 U.S. National Monuments and 14 National Conservation Areas to be managed by the Bureau of Land Management in such a way as to keep them "healthy, open, and wild."

A major issue involved low fees charged ranchers who grazed cattle on public lands. The "animal unit month" (AUM) fee was only $1.35 and was far below the 1983 market value. The argument was that the federal government in effect was subsidizing ranchers, with a few major corporations controlling millions of acres of grazing land. Babbitt and Oklahoma Congressman Mike Synar tried to rally environmentalists and raise fees, but senators from the Western United States successfully blocked their proposals.

=== Agriculture ===
Although Governor Clinton had a large farm base in Arkansas, as president he sharply cut support for farmers and raised taxes on tobacco. At one high level policy meeting budget expert Alice Rivlin told the president she had a new slogan for his reelection campaign: "I'm going to end welfare as we know it for farmers." Clinton was annoyed and retorted, "Farmers are good people. I know we have to do these things. We're going to make these cuts. But we don't have to feel good about it."

With exports accounting for more than a fourth of farm output, farm organizations joined business interests to defeat human rights activists regarding Most Favored Nation (MFN) trade status for China. They took the position that major tariff increases would hurt importers and consumers. They warned that China would retaliate to hurt American exporters. They wanted more liberal trade policies and less attention to Chinese human rights abuses.

Environmentalists began taking a keen interest in agricultural policies. They feared that farming had a growing negative impact on the environment in terms of soil erosion and the destruction of wetlands. The expanding use of pesticides and fertilizers polluted soil and water not just on each farm but downstream into rivers and lakes and urban areas as well.

=== Education ===
In the eight years before Clinton took office, federal funding for primary and secondary education averaged $8.5 billion a year, but over Clinton's two terms that average rose to $11.1 billion. The considerable increase in funding was supported by the Improving America's Schools Act of 1994, which reauthorized the Elementary and Secondary Education Act of 1965. The goals were to improve accountability in schools and help low-income students succeed, while giving schools new authority to incorporate technology into curricula so that every student would be able to benefit from the technology revolution and contribute to its next wave.

Federal support for higher education was also expanded, with the maximum Pell Grant award increased and funding levels for student financial assistance increased by 20% by the end of Clinton's term. The 1993 Student Loan Reform Act introduced direct federal student loans, leading to both lower borrowing costs for students and billions in savings for the federal government. In 1997, two tax credits were passed to help defray the costs of higher education: the Hope Scholarship tax credit and the Lifetime Learning tax credit. Federal funding for scientific research was boosted, with funding for the National Science Foundation increased by more than 30%, and the annual budget for the Department of Energy's Office of Science nearly doubled to $2.8 billion. The GEAR UP college preparation program, launched in 1998, started to provide federal grants to high-poverty middle schools and high schools. All students within those schools were provided with services to help them succeed in school and enter college, and as of 2000–2001, 200,000 students were served by GEAR UP. To increase Internet access and reduce the "digital divide" funding for Community Technology Centers (which were located in urban and rural neighborhoods that had little or no Internet access) was tripled. Expanded Educational technology was expanded, with the amount spent on educational technology increased from $27 million in 1994 to $769 million by 2000, and as part of the Telecommunications Act of 1996, Clinton won the inclusion of "E-Rate", which subsidized Internet access for schools and libraries.

=== Community reinvestment ===
Under Clinton's direction, lenders covered under the Community Reinvestment Act stepped up their efforts, with banks and thrifts subject to CRA issuing $800 billion in sustainable home mortgage, small-business, and community development loans to low- and moderate-income borrowers and communities from 1993 to 1999. In 2001, the New Markets and Community Renewal initiative was passed by Congress, which invested $25 billion in new incentives for growth in low-income communities to create nine new Empowerment Zones, bringing the total created under Clinton to 40. The low-income housing tax credit was increased to build an additional 700,000 units of affordable housing, and the New Markets Tax Credit was created by the Community Renewal Tax Relief Act of 2000, which encouraged venture capital firms to support small-business startups and rural development. In addition, 40 Renewal Communities were created with targeted, pro-growth tax benefits to spur robust outside investment. As a means of creating a nationwide network of community development banks, the Treasury Department's Community Development Financial Institutions Fund was established. By 2000, the CDFI Fund had issued $436 million in total grants, loans, equity investments, and technical assistance to local financial institutions, banks, and thrifts, which increased their community development activities by upward of $2.4 billion. In 1999, the Ticket to Work and Work Incentives Improvement Act, designed to help beneficiaries of SSI who wished to work to join the workforce without losing their Medicaid benefits, was signed into law.

Responding to declining home-ownership rates for low-income families, Clinton sought to reform the Community Reinvestment Act (CRA) to encourage banks to make loans to inhabitants of low-income areas. The administration implemented new rules that would prevent banks from expanding if they failed to meet benchmarks for loans to low-income areas. Between 1993 and 1998, CRA lending increased at a faster rate than other loans, and home values in many CRA areas rose. Banks implemented new strategies designed to cater to lower-income borrowers, including the adjustable-rate mortgage. This effort was part of a broader initiative, the National Homeownership Strategy, which helped increase the share of Americans who owned their own homes from 64 percent to 67.4% during Clinton's presidency. Subprime lending that allowed Americans to purchase homes later played a role in the 2008 financial crisis.

=== Immigration ===
In 1996, Clinton signed H.R. 3610 which included the Illegal Immigration Reform and Immigrant Responsibility Act of 1996.

=== Other policies ===
==== Copyright ====
The Digital Millennium Copyright Act, enacted by Clinton on October 21, 1998, served as the first significant amendment to the Copyright Act since 1976. The DMCA provided a framework for sound recording copyright owners and recording artists to seek public performance royalties under statute, which proved to be a landmark achievement for the recording industry. The law included a provision reiterating the "fair use" of copyrighted materials, and another provision that exempted internet service providers from responsibility for inadvertently transmitting copyrighted works. That same month, Clinton also signed the Copyright Term Extension Act, which retroactively extended copyright protection and stopped copyrighted works entering into the public domain for an extra twenty years.

==== Pardons ====
"Pardongate" was the Bill Clinton pardon controversy when critics attacked his manner of giving out 450 pardons, a third of them on his last day in office. Scholars use two different models to describe the pardons process. Clinton used the presidential model, viewing the pardon power as a convenient resource to be used to help party activists or to advance specific policy goals. Critics favored the agency model, which views the pardons process as a nonpolitical matter for legal experts in the Department of Justice. An investigation found that he was legally within his rights.

=== Neoliberal policies ===
The Clinton administration embraced neoliberal policies. Major neoliberal policies included the passage of the North American Free Trade Agreement (NAFTA), continuing the deregulation of the financial sector through passage of the Commodity Futures Modernization Act and the repeal of the Glass–Steagall Act and implementing cuts to the welfare state through passage of the Personal Responsibility and Work Opportunity Act. The American historian Gary Gerstle writes that while Reagan was the ideological architect of the neoliberal order which was formulated in the 1970s and 1980s, it was Clinton who was its key facilitator, and as such this order achieved dominance in the 1990s and early 2000s. The neoliberalism of the Clinton administration differs from that of Reagan as the Clinton administration purged neoliberalism of neoconservative positions on militarism, family values, opposition to multiculturalism and neglect of ecological issues. Writing in New York, journalist Jonathan Chait disputed accusations that the Democratic Party had been hijacked by neoliberals, saying that its policies have largely stayed the same since the New Deal. Instead, Chait suggested these accusations arose from arguments that presented a false dichotomy between free-market economics and socialism, ignoring mixed economies. American feminist philosopher Nancy Fraser says the modern Democratic Party has embraced a "progressive neoliberalism", which she describes as a "progressive-neoliberal alliance of financialization plus emancipation". Historian Walter Scheidel says that both parties shifted to promote free-market capitalism in the 1970s, with the Democratic Party being "instrumental in implementing financial deregulation in the 1990s". Historians Andrew Diamond and Thomas Sugrue argue that neoliberalism became a "'dominant rationality' precisely because it could not be confined to a single partisan identity." Economic and political inequalities in schools, universities, and libraries and an undermining of democratic and civil society institutions influenced by neoliberalism has been explored by Buschman.

== Foreign affairs ==
Clinton made 54 international trips to 73 different countries during his presidency.

Critics agree that foreign policy was not a high priority for Clinton and his administration. According to Harvard Professor Stephen Walt:

Critics on the right argue that he is too eager to accommodate a rising China, too blind to Russia's corruption and cronyism, and too slow to use force against states like Yugoslavia or Iraq. On the left, liberals bemoan Clinton's failure to prevent the genocide in Rwanda, his tardy response to the bloodletting in the Balkans, and his abandonment of his early pledge to build a multilateral world order grounded in stronger international institutions. Even pragmatic centrists find him wanting, deriding his foreign policy as "social work" that is too easily swayed by ethnic lobbies, public opinion polls, and media buzz.

Walt, however, gives two cheers for Clinton's realism and his accomplishments:

Under Clinton, the United States consolidated its Cold War victory by bringing three former Warsaw Pact members into its own alliance. It shored up its alliances in East Asia and readied itself for a possible competition with a rising China while encouraging Beijing to accept a status quo that favored the United States....It forced its allies to bear a greater share of the burden in Europe and East Asia while insisting on leading both alliances. And together with its NATO allies, it asserted the right to intervene in the sovereign territory of other states, even without Security Council authorization. Clinton may cloak U.S. policy in the rhetoric of "world order" and general global interests, but its defining essence remains the unilateral exercise of sovereign power.

=== Trade ===
Remarks on the Signing of NAFTA (December 8, 1993)
Clinton's December 8, 1993, remarks on the signing of the North American Free Trade Agreement

Remarks on the Signing of NAFTA (December 8, 1993)
audio only version

With the end of the Cold War, trade became an increasingly prominent issue in international politics, as countries sought reduced tariffs and other trade agreements. Clinton believed that globalization would promote economic prosperity and democratization throughout the world, and he pursued several major trade agreements. President Bush had signed the North American Free Trade Agreement (NAFTA) with Canada and Mexico in the final year of his term, but the agreement had not yet been ratified when Clinton took office. Opposition to NAFTA crossed party lines, as organized labor allies like Democratic Congressman Dick Gephardt and conservative isolationists like Pat Buchanan both opposed ratification. With the fate of NAFTA still uncertain in the House of Representatives, Vice President Gore met Ross Perot in a televised debate. Gore's strong performance in the debate, as well as the Clinton administration's effective lobbying campaign, helped NAFTA win ratification in November 1993.

The administration negotiated approximately 300 trade agreements with other countries. By granting China temporary most favoured nation status in 1993, his administration minimized tariff levels on Chinese imports. In 2000, Clinton signed a bill granting permanent normal trade relations to China, and American imports from China massively increased in the subsequent years.

=== Irish peace talks ===
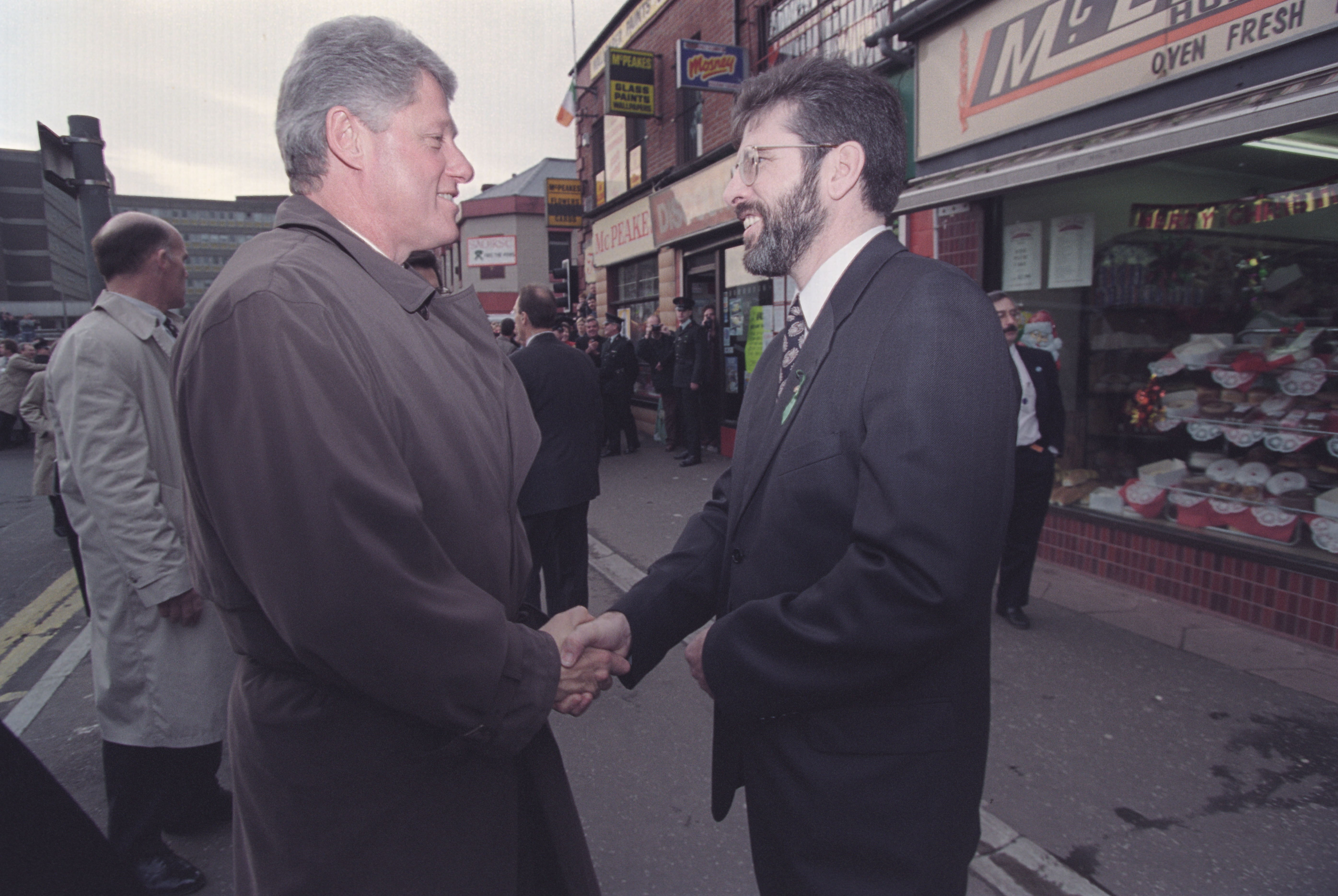
Clinton shaking hands with Gerry Adams outside a business in West Belfast, November 30, 1995

In 1992, before his presidency, Clinton proposed sending a peace envoy to Northern Ireland, but this was dropped to avoid tensions with the British government. In November 1995, in a ceasefire during the Troubles, Clinton became the first president to visit Northern Ireland, examining both of the two divided communities of Belfast. Despite unionist criticism, Clinton used this as a way to negotiate an end to the violent conflict with London, Dublin, the paramilitaries and the other groups. Clinton went on to play a key role in the peace talks, which produced the Good Friday Agreement in 1998.

=== Military interventions ===
==== Somalia ====
Unrest in Somalia had escalated into a full-scale civil war in 1991. President Bush had dispatched 25,000 soldiers to the country to join a United Nations peacekeeping mission. By the late 1993, Somalia remained in a state of civil war, and 4,000 American soldiers still served in the UN peacekeeping mission. In October 1993, U.S. special forces launched a raid on Mogadishu with the intention of capturing warlord Mohamed Farrah Aidid, who had led attacks against U.N. forces. The raid ended in failure and in the deaths of eighteen Americans. The humiliating incident led Americans to question the presence of U.S. soldiers in Somalia. After Somali leaders signed a peace agreement in early 1994, Clinton removed U.S. forces from the country.

==== Rwanda ====
The experience in Somalia exacerbated internal debates around the role of American military power in the Post–Cold War era. In a victory for those who favored non-intervention, Clinton placed new limits on the deployment of his troops, especially as part of U.N. peacekeeping missions. In April 1994, the Hutu of Rwanda engaged in a genocide against the minority Tutsi, killing 800,000 people in a three-month span. The UN sent a small force to provide aid, but the U.S., with no strategic or economic interest in the country, did not intervene. Clinton would later describe the non-intervention in Rwanda as the worst mistake of his administration.

==== Haiti ====
A military junta in Haiti had ousted the country's democratically elected president, Jean-Bertrand Aristide, in 1991. Clinton was inclined to restore Aristide, in part due to stem the flow of Haitians fleeing to the U.S., despite his previous opposition to Bush's restrictions on Haitian immigration. However, many Americans opposed a military intervention in a nation which posed no threat to the United States. Despite congressional and public opposition, Clinton announced in September 1994 that he would remove the junta if it did not voluntarily relinquish power. At the same time, he sent a peace mission consisting of Powell, former president Jimmy Carter, and Senator Sam Nunn to convince the military government to step aside. As U.S. soldiers prepared to launch a strike against Haiti, the military government agreed to restore Aristide and no combat took place. 3,446 Haitian refugees arrived in the United States in 1994.

=== Balkans: Serbia, Bosnia ===
Map of the six Yugoslav republics and autonomous provinces in 1991

During the closing stages of the Cold War, Serbian nationalist Slobodan Milošević took power as the leader of the Socialist Republic of Serbia. His nationalist policies alienated leaders of the other constituent countries of Yugoslavia, a multi-ethnic state that had been established in 1918. Slovenia, Croatia, and the Republic of Macedonia each declared independence from Yugoslavia in 1991, but Serbian forces forcefully opposed Croatia's independence, beginning the Yugoslav Wars. In 1992, Bosnia and Herzegovina also declared independence. As in Croatia, a significant minority of Serbs opposed to independence lived in Bosnia and Herzegovina, and the Bosnian War began between proponents and opponents of independence. Ethnic cleansing campaigns conducted by Bosnian Serbs provoked world condemnation, and the issue of whether to intervene in the Balkan Wars posed one of the greatest foreign policy questions as Clinton took office. Activists such Elie Wiesel pressured Clinton to help put an end to the ethnic cleansing, and Clinton himself wanted to do something to end the violence. General Colin Powell initially convinced Clinton to abstain from a military intervention, arguing that the United States should not become involved in a region in which it lacked clear strategic interests.

In May 1994, after Serb forces invaded safe zones established by the United Nations Protection Force, Clinton authorized air strikes against Serb positions. The air strikes did not end Serb advances, and in July 1995 over 8,000 Bosniaks were killed in the Srebrenica massacre. Clinton and National Security Adviser Anthony Lake formulated a plan to end the genocide in Bosnia, with the key part of the plan being a major NATO air campaign against the Bosnian Serbs. After Clinton won the support of European leaders for the campaign, NATO launched Operation Deliberate Force. In reaction to bombing campaign and the advance of Bosniak forces, Milošević agreed to begin peace talks. Clinton sponsored the talks in Dayton Ohio, putting Richard Holbrooke in charge. The subsequent Dayton Agreement ended the Bosnian War and divided Bosnia into two autonomous regions.

=== Kosovo ===
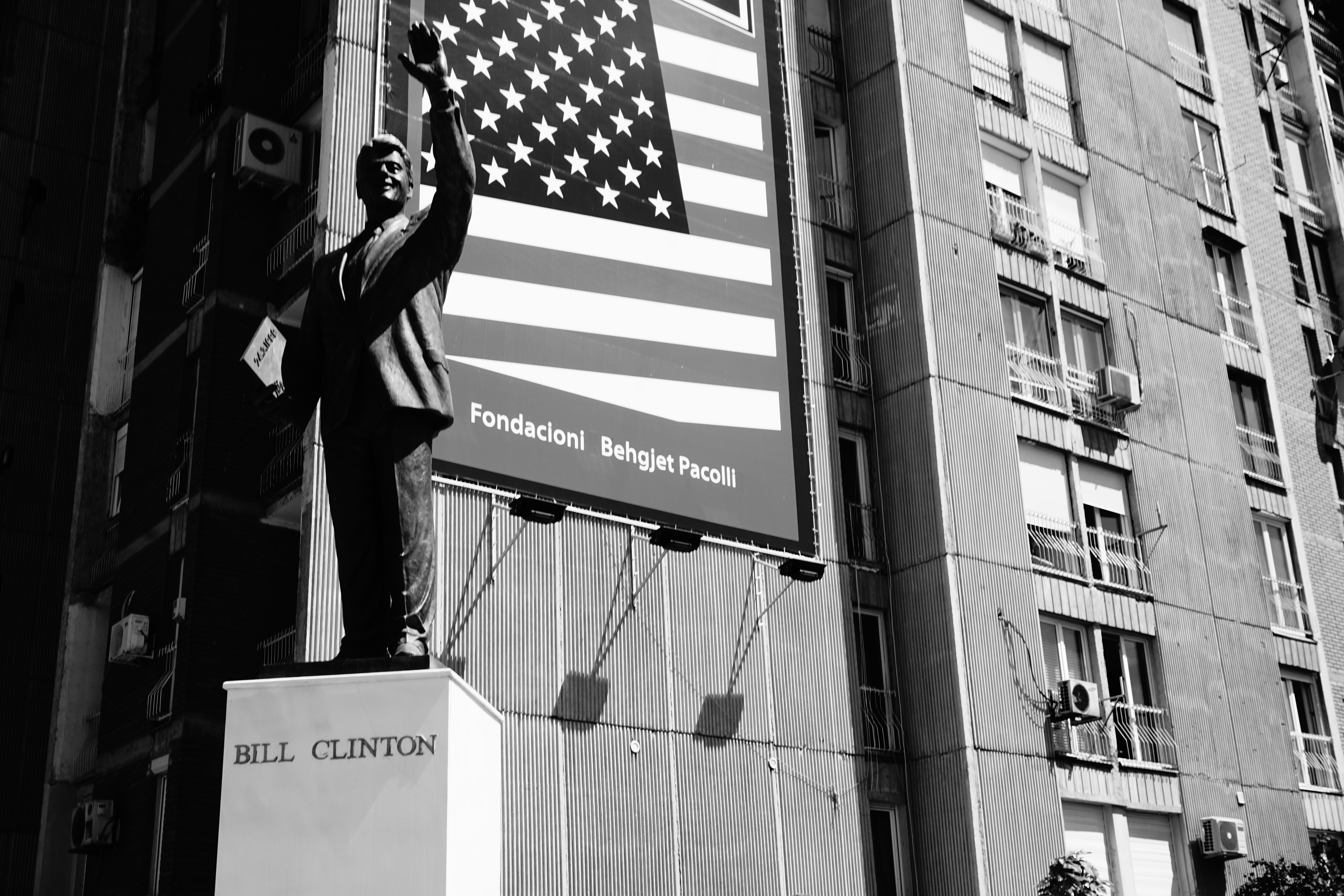
Statue of Bill Clinton located on Bill Clinton Boulevard in Pristina, Kosovo

In 1998, the Kosovo War broke out in Kosovo, an autonomous province of Serbia. A group of ethnic Albanians known as the Kosovo Liberation Army sought independence, launching attacks against Serb forces. In putting down the attacks, Serb forces engaged in an ethnic cleaning campaign against the Albanian population. Though NATO leaders were reluctant to become involved, and Russia threatened to veto any U.N. resolution allowing for military action, many of Clinton's advisers called for another intervention in the Balkans. Hoping to again force Milošević into peace talks, Clinton ordered a bombing campaign against Serb forces in March 1999. As Milošević refused to capitulate, NATO escalated the bombing campaign, resulting in the devastation of the Serbian capital of Belgrade. As domestic opposition to his leadership grew, Milošević agreed to withdraw troops and allow NATO-led peacekeeping force to be stationed in Kosovo. Kosovo's status would be disputed in subsequent years, while Milošević was overthrown in October 2000.

=== NATO and Russia ===
Clinton presided over the admission of Hungary, Poland and the Czech Republic into NATO

One of Clinton's major priorities was the expansion of NATO into former Eastern Bloc countries in Eastern Europe, as Clinton believed that NATO would provide a stabilizing influence on these countries. Russian leaders felt threatened as NATO approached its border. Clinton cultivated a close relationship with Russian president Boris Yeltsin, and in 1997, Clinton won Yeltsin's reluctant assent to the expansion of NATO, clearing the way for the accession of Hungary, Poland, and the Czech Republic. Yeltsin pressed for a commitment not to expand NATO into the Baltic states, but Clinton was not willing to bind his successors to such a promise. The French pushed for the addition of Romania and Slovenia to NATO, but Clinton opposed this move, as he believed that too quick of an expansion into Eastern Europe would dilute the strength of NATO.

Clinton tried to help Yeltsin avoid an economic depression, reform the Russian economy, and prevent a resurgence of Communism. Clinton quietly helped Yeltsin win reelection in 1996, and played a major role in Russia's entrance into the Group of Eight (G8), a conference of the countries with the largest economies.

=== Terrorism ===
Terrorism emerged as an increasingly important national security issue during Clinton's administration. In the closing years of the Soviet–Afghan War, Osama bin Laden had organized al-Qaeda, a militant Sunni organization. The al-Qaeda leaders despised Western values, and were particularly incensed by the U.S. military presence in Saudi Arabia. Al-Qaeda grew during the 1990s and engaged in terrorism in the Middle East and elsewhere. The group claimed responsibility for the 1993 World Trade Center bombing, the bombings of two U.S. embassies in East Africa, and the bombing of a U.S. ship at port in Yemen. In retaliation, Clinton ordered the bombing of al-Qaeda facilities in Afghanistan and Sudan. The Central Intelligence Agency and the military tracked bin Laden's movements in an attempt to capture or kill him, but Bin Laden evaded capture deep within the mountains of Afghanistan.

=== North Korea ===
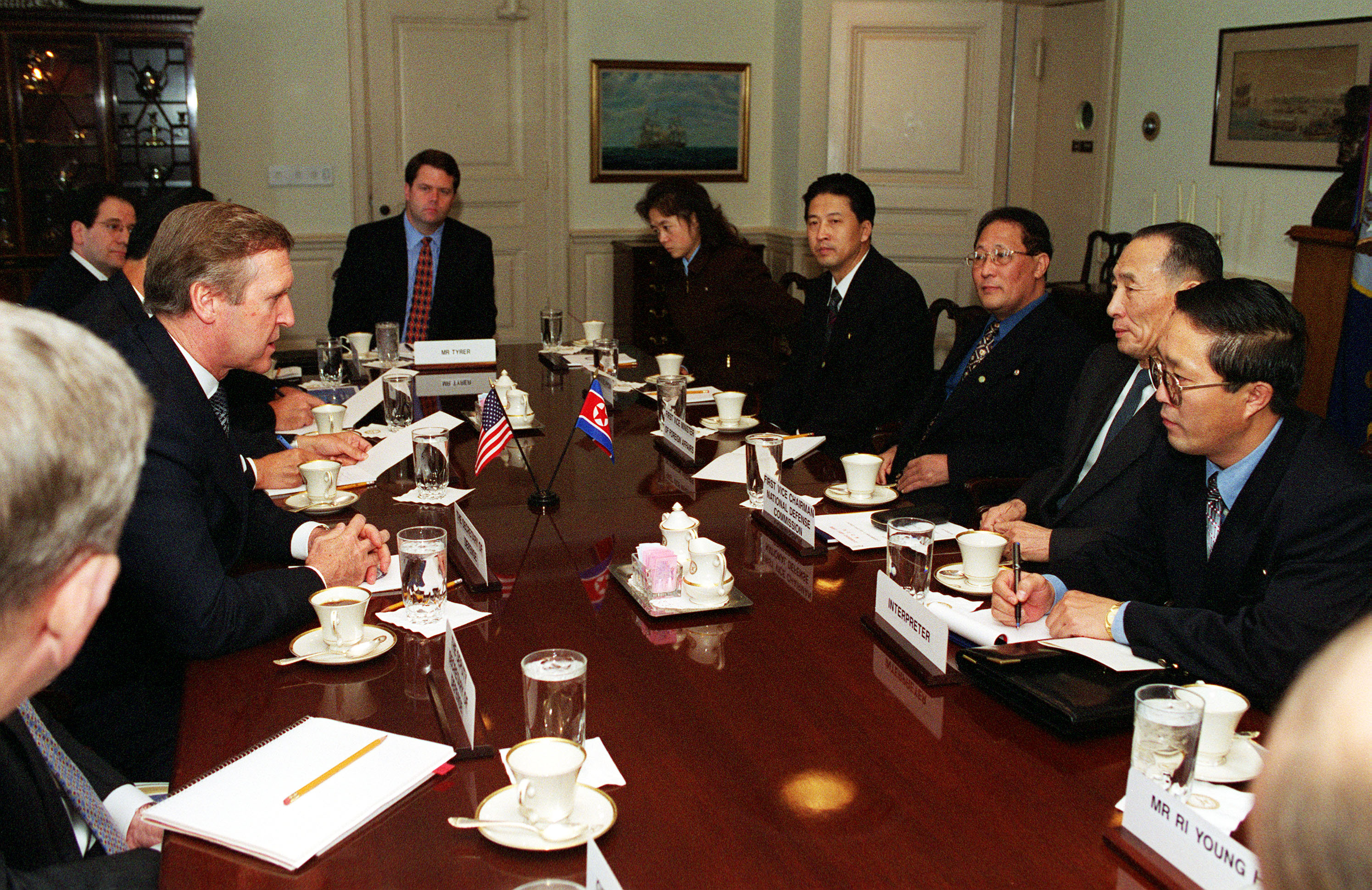
Jo Myong-rok (center right), Kim Jong-il's defence minister, with U.S. Secretary of Defense William Cohen, 2000

In 1994, North Korea blocked international inspectors from verifying the regime's adherence to the Nuclear Nonproliferation Treaty. The administration believed that the North Koreans were processing plutonium from a reactor to build two atomic bombs.

President Clinton recalled that "I was determined to prevent North Korea from developing a nuclear arsenal, even at the risk of war". Declassified Clinton-era documents illustrate that the administration had planned for a possible war during the 1994 nuclear crisis.

The Pentagon had hypothetical plans to strike the North Korea nuclear reactor at Yongbyon, but the order was never given.

=== Middle East ===
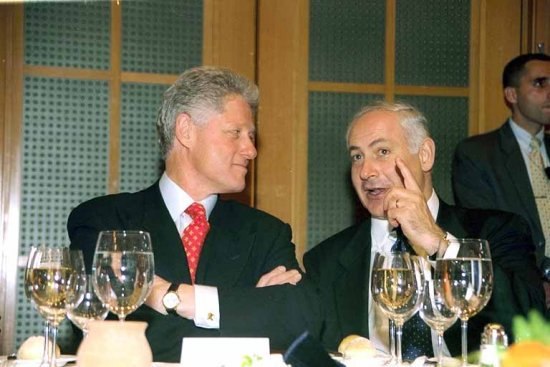
Clinton with Israeli Prime Minister Benjamin Netanyahu on December 13, 1998

Clinton sought to mediate the Arab–Israeli conflict, encouraging the leaders of Israel and the Palestine Liberation Organization to reach the 1993 Oslo Accords. A subsequent agreement created the Palestinian National Authority, which was given control over the Gaza Strip, a territory that Israel had taken control of in the 1967 Six-Day War. During his second terms, Clinton sought to revive the dormant peace process, specifically by convincing Israel to turn over control of the West Bank, another territory captured in the Six-Day War. Clinton hosted the 2000 Camp David Summit between Palestinian leader Yasser Arafat and Israeli prime minister Ehud Barak, but the two sides were unable to reach an agreement. In September 2000, the Palestinians launched an uprising known as the Second Intifada, which would continue after the end of Clinton's presidency.

Clinton maintained the economic sanctions and the no-fly zones imposed on Iraq in the aftermath of the Persian Gulf War. In retaliation for Iraq's attempted assassination of former president Bush, Clinton ordered cruise missile strikes on the headquarters of the Iraqi Intelligence Service. After Hussein repeatedly obstructed the UN commission charged with monitoring Iraq's WMD program, the U.S. and Britain engaged in a bombing campaign against Iraqi weapon facilities. These raids would continue intermittently until the 2003 invasion of Iraq.

=== Mexico ===
In January 1995, Clinton's economic advisers informed him that the Mexican government would default on its loans unless the U.S. offered a $25 billion loan package. Though Clinton and Speaker of the House Gingrich both believed that preventing the Mexican economy from collapsing was important to U.S. interests, Congress refused to authorize an aid package. The Clinton administration also helped limit the effects of the 1997 Asian financial crisis by keeping U.S. markets open.

=== Land mine ban ===
Clinton's tenure included a widespread international push against the use of land mines due to their long-term risks to civilians, including the ratification of the Ottawa Treaty by countries around the world. Clinton agreed in 1996 to prescribe some limits on how the U.S. military would use mines, though he refused to make the U.S. a signatory to the treaty. In 1998, he stated that the U.S. would become a party to the treaty by 2006. As of May 2026, the U.S. has still not ratified the treaty.

=== Other issues ===
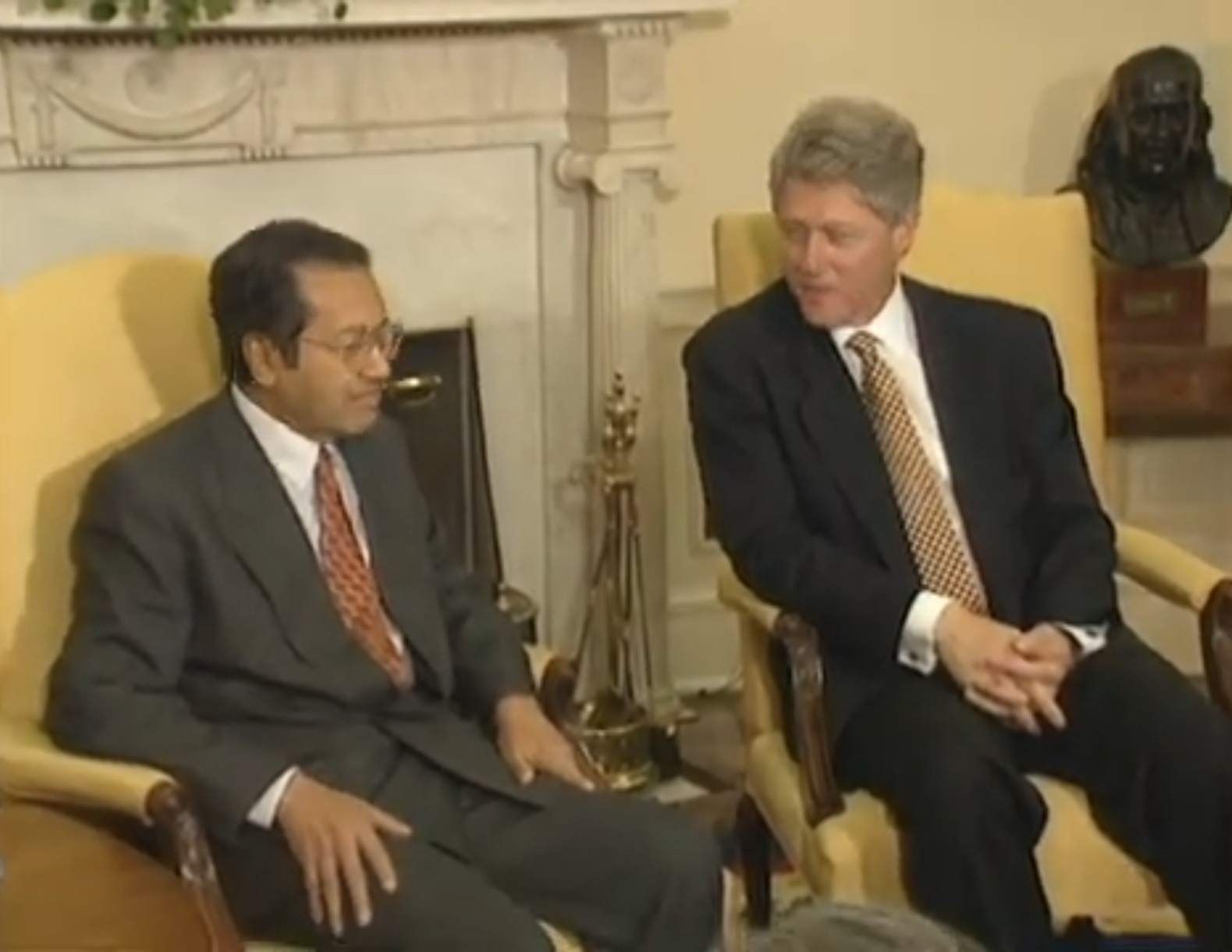
Clinton with Malaysian prime minister Mahathir Mohamad in 1994

Despite opposition from conservatives and veterans of the Vietnam War, Clinton normalized relations with Vietnam in 1995. In 2000, he became the first U.S. president to visit Vietnam since the conclusion of the Vietnam War. Clinton was also the first president to visit Botswana, Slovenia, and South Africa.

In 1997, Tony Blair of the Labour Party won election as the prime minister of the United Kingdom. Clinton and Blair shared a centrist approach to politics, and they jointly promoted their "Third Way" (between traditional left-wing and right-wing policies) on the international stage.

== Impeachment and acquittal ==
Remarks including response to Clinton–Lewinsky scandal (January 26, 1998)
Bill Clinton making a presentation that ends with a short commentary on the Clinton–Lewinsky scandal. The presentation is known for the quote "I did not have sexual relations with that woman, Miss Lewinsky." (6:07)

Remarks including response to Monica Lewinsky scandal (January 26, 1998)
audio only version

Prior to taking office, Bill and Hillary Clinton had invested in the Whitewater Development Corporation, a real estate development company owned by Jim McDougal and Susan McDougal that quickly went bankrupt. The McDougals were later charged with fraud due to their activities connected to a savings and loan association. The July 1993 death of Deputy White House Counsel Vince Foster raised new allegations about the Clintons' connections to the savings and loan associations, marking the start of what became known as the Whitewater controversy. To defuse allegations stemming from Foster's death, Clinton authorized Attorney General Reno to appoint a special prosecutor under the terms of the Ethics in Government Act. Later, a special three-judge panel convened and appointed Ken Starr, a former U.S. solicitor general, as an independent counsel charged with investigating the Whitewater controversy. Starr's investigation expanded beyond Whitewater, in part because of a sexual harassment lawsuit filed against Clinton by Paula Jones, a former Arkansas employee.

In 1998, Starr's office learned that a White House intern, Monica Lewinsky, had engaged in an affair with Clinton. In a deposition related to the Jones lawsuit, Clinton swore under oath that he had not engaged in sexual relations with Lewinsky. Clinton was able to squash rumors of the affair until July 1998, when Starr reached an immunity deal with Lewinsky and obtained her confession of the affair. Clinton publicly apologized for having an affair with Lewinsky in September 1998. Though Clinton argued that he had not lied under oath in his answers to the questions asked at the Jones deposition, the House Judiciary Committee began impeachment proceedings against Clinton. The controversy over Lewinsky enveloped Congress and the presidency, derailing the administration's hopes for reforming Medicare and Social Security. Individuals from both parties were outraged by Clinton's affair with an intern, but many Democrats were mollified by Clinton's repeated public apologies and viewed the reaction from the media and Republicans as disproportionate to the gravity of the affair.

The House passed two articles of impeachment against Clinton. In January 1999, the Senate began the second presidential impeachment trial in U.S. history, after that of Andrew Johnson. Removal of the president would require a two-thirds vote of the Senate. Clinton was acquitted of the first article by a vote of 45 to convict to 55 to acquit, and acquitted of the second by a vote of 50–50. In 1999, Congress chose not to renew the independent counsel law that had allowed Starr's appointment, meaning that future investigations of a similar nature would be conducted under the oversight of the Justice Department rather than through a judicial panel. Clinton would later publicly acknowledge that he "knowingly gave evasive and misleading answers" in the Jones deposition.

== Elections during the Clinton presidency ==
Congressional party leaders
		Senate leaders		House leaders	
Congress	Year	Majority	Minority	Speaker	Minority
103rd	1993–1994	Mitchell	Dole	Foley	Michel
104th	1995–1996	Dole	Daschle	Gingrich	Gephardt
104th	1996	Lott (Note: Bob Dole resigned as Senate Majority Leader on June 11, 1996. Trent Lott was elected to replace Dole as Senate Majority Leader on June 12, 1996.)	Daschle	Gingrich	Gephardt
105th	1997–1998	Lott	Daschle	Gingrich	Gephardt
106th	1999–2000	Lott	Daschle	Hastert	Gephardt
107th (Note: 17 days of the 103rd Congress (January 3, 1993 – January 19, 1993) took place under President Bush, and 17 days of the 107th Congress (January 3, 2001 – January 19, 2001) took place during Clinton's second term.)	2001	Daschle (Note: With Democratic vice president Al Gore provides the tie-breaking vote, the Democrats also holding a majority in the Senate until January 20, 2001.)	Lott	Hastert	Gephardt

Democratic seats in Congress
Congress	Senate	House
103rd	57	258
104th	47	204
105th	45	207
106th	45	211
107th	50	212

=== 1994 mid-term elections ===
A series of controversies, including the debate over gays in the military, contentious confirmation battles, and "Travelgate", sank Clinton's approval ratings to just 37 percent in mid-1993. Further setbacks related to health care and foreign policy left Clinton in a weak position in the lead-up to the 1994 elections. Led by Newt Gingrich, House Republicans created the Contract with America, which promised an overhaul of the federal welfare system and passage of a balanced budget amendment, term limits, and deregulation. Republican won control of both chambers of Congress, picking up 54 seats in the House of Representatives and 9 Senate seats. As the victory gave Republicans unified control of Congress for the first time since 1955, some commentators referred to the 1994 elections as the "Republican Revolution".

=== 1996 re-election campaign ===
President Clinton defeated Republican Bob Dole in the 1996 presidential election.

Clinton's handling of the budget and the Bosnian War improved his approval ratings, and his own polling showed him consistently leading Republican challengers throughout 1996. Senate Majority Leader Bob Dole defeated Pat Buchanan and publisher Steve Forbes in the 1996 Republican primaries, and Dole was formally nominated at the August 1996 Republican National Convention. At the convention, Dole selected conservative former Congressman Jack Kemp as his running mate and announced that he favored a 15% across-the-board income tax cut. Perot ran for president again, this time as a member of the Reform Party.

Clinton made a four-day whistle-stop train tour in route to the Democratic convention in Chicago in August. The main theme was centrism. In his acceptance speech Clinton called on the American people to, "help build that bridge to the 21st century for all our children," and avoid Bob Dole's "bridge to the past." He promised more tax cuts and benefits "for the hard-working citizen who plays by the rules." Promising the best is yet to come, he reaffirmed his belief "in a place called Hope, a place called America."

Clinton continued to position himself as a centrist, stating in early 1996 that "the era of Big Government is over." Meanwhile, Dole, one of the oldest major party presidential nominees in history, proved to be an ineffective campaigner. Clinton won by landslides in the popular vote and the Electoral College. Dole performed poorly outside the Mountain states and the South. Clinton built his landslide on the votes of women, African-Americans, Hispanics, younger voters, and retired voters. Dole conceded defeat gracefully and with good humor after nearly a half-century in public office. Turnout was low, at 49%.

Despite Clinton's victory, the Republicans retained control of the House and the Senate in the 1996 congressional elections. With Republicans in control of Congress, Clinton refrained from proposing major domestic initiatives in his second term. He made a few changes to important positions including Erskine Bowles as his new Chief of Staff. Madeleine Albright became Secretary of State; William Cohen, a Republican, became Secretary of Defense; Anthony Lake became director of the CIA; and Sandy Berger became National Security Advisor.

=== 1998 mid-term elections ===
In the midst of the impeachment hearings, Clinton's approval ratings rose above 65 percent. Polls showed that many in the public did not condone Clinton's relations with Lewinsky, but they did not believe that it was grounds for removal from office. Defying predictions of congressional losses, the Democrats picked up five seats in the House of Representatives; neither party gained seats in the Senate. The election represented the first time since 1934 that the party holding the presidency picked up seats in a mid-term election. Gingrich resigned from office after the elections, and he was succeeded as Speaker of the House by Dennis Hastert.

=== 2000 elections and transition period ===
Republican George W. Bush defeated Democrat Al Gore in the 2000 presidential election.

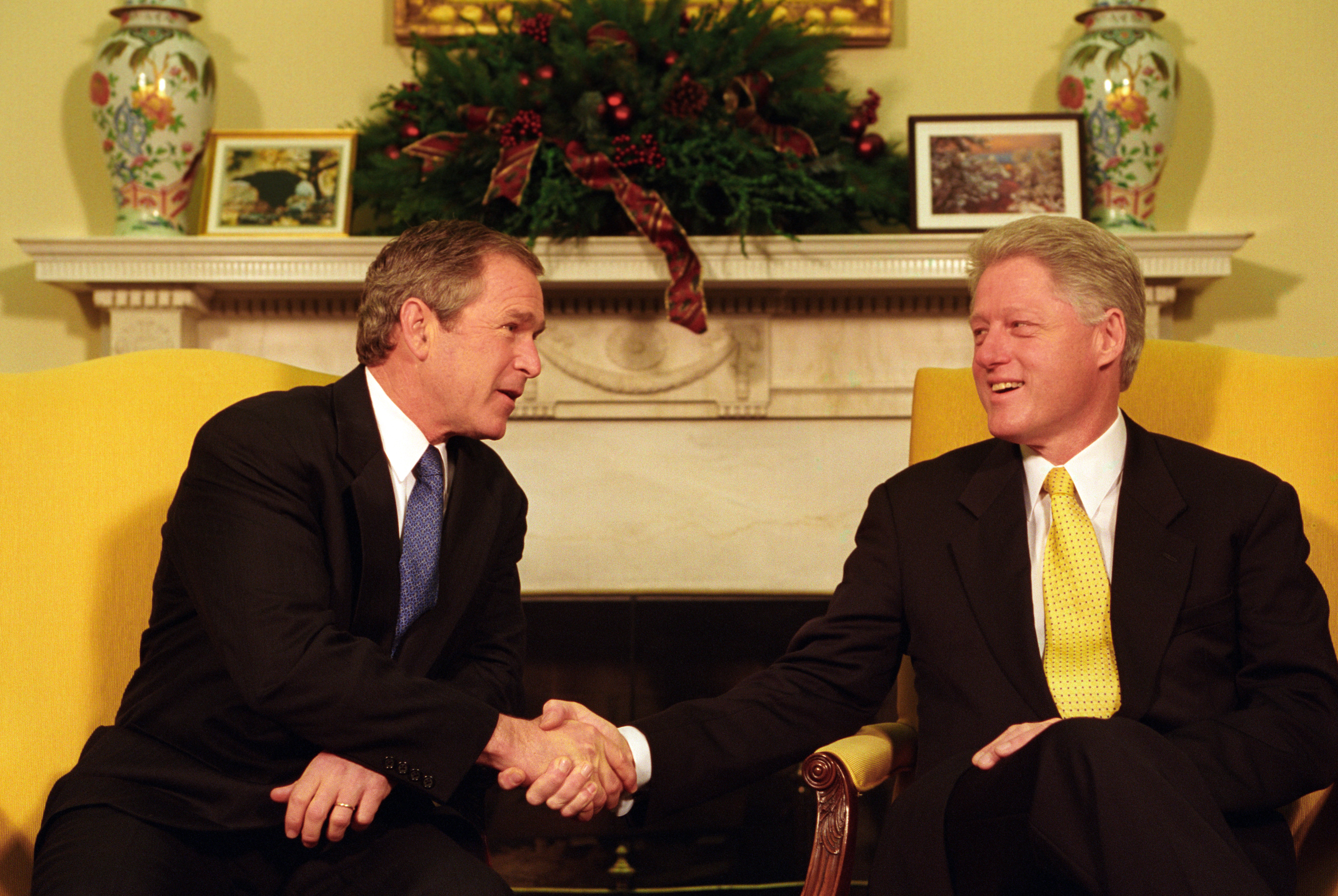
Outgoing president Bill Clinton and President-elect George W. Bush in the Oval Office on December 19, 2000

The 2000 elections took place on November 7. Clinton was term-limited in 2000 due to the 22nd Amendment. Vice President Al Gore dispatched a challenge from Senator Bill Bradley of New Jersey early in the 2000 Democratic primaries. Gore chose Senator Joe Lieberman of Connecticut, a prominent intra-party critic of Clinton and the affair with Lewinsky, as his running mate. Texas governor George W. Bush, the son of former president Bush, won the Republican nomination after defeating Senator John McCain of Arizona in the 2000 Republican primaries. For his running mate, Bush selected Dick Cheney, who had served as Secretary of Defense under George H. W. Bush. Pat Buchanan ran as the Reform Party nominee, and he called for a reduction in immigration. Ralph Nader ran as the Green Party candidate, winning support from many liberals who were disappointed by the centrist tendencies of Clinton and Gore.

Bush called for major tax cuts, a partial privatization of Social Security, and school vouchers. He also criticized Clinton for "nation building" in Haiti and other countries, and attacked Clinton's sexual indiscretions. Clinton and Gore had been close political partners for much of Clinton's presidency, but Gore kept his distance from Clinton during the presidential campaign. In the election, Gore won a narrow plurality of the popular vote, taking 48.4 percent to Bush's 47.9 percent and Nader's 2.7 percent. Gore won much of the Northeast, the Midwest, and the Pacific Coast, while Bush dominated the South and the Interior West. However, the winner of the election was unclear on election night, as neither candidate had definitively secured a majority of the electoral vote.

The outcome of the election hinged on Florida, which had endured an extremely close presidential election. Over the ensuing five weeks, both campaigns waged an intense legal battle over election law as Florida conducted a recount. The Supreme Court of Florida unanimously upheld the recount, but the Bush team appealed to the Supreme Court of the United States. On December 12, in a 5–4 decision, the Supreme Court ordered an end to the recount, leaving Bush as the winner of Florida and the winner of the election. Bush became the fourth individual in U.S. history, and the first since 1888, to win the election despite losing the popular vote. Republicans also retained control of the House and the Senate, giving the party unified control of Congress and the presidency for the first time since the 1954 election. Despite the best looking and strong economy in years, Clinton's legacy was overshadowed by Gore's election loss in 2000, however Clinton still left office with 66% approval rating.

== Evaluation and legacy ==
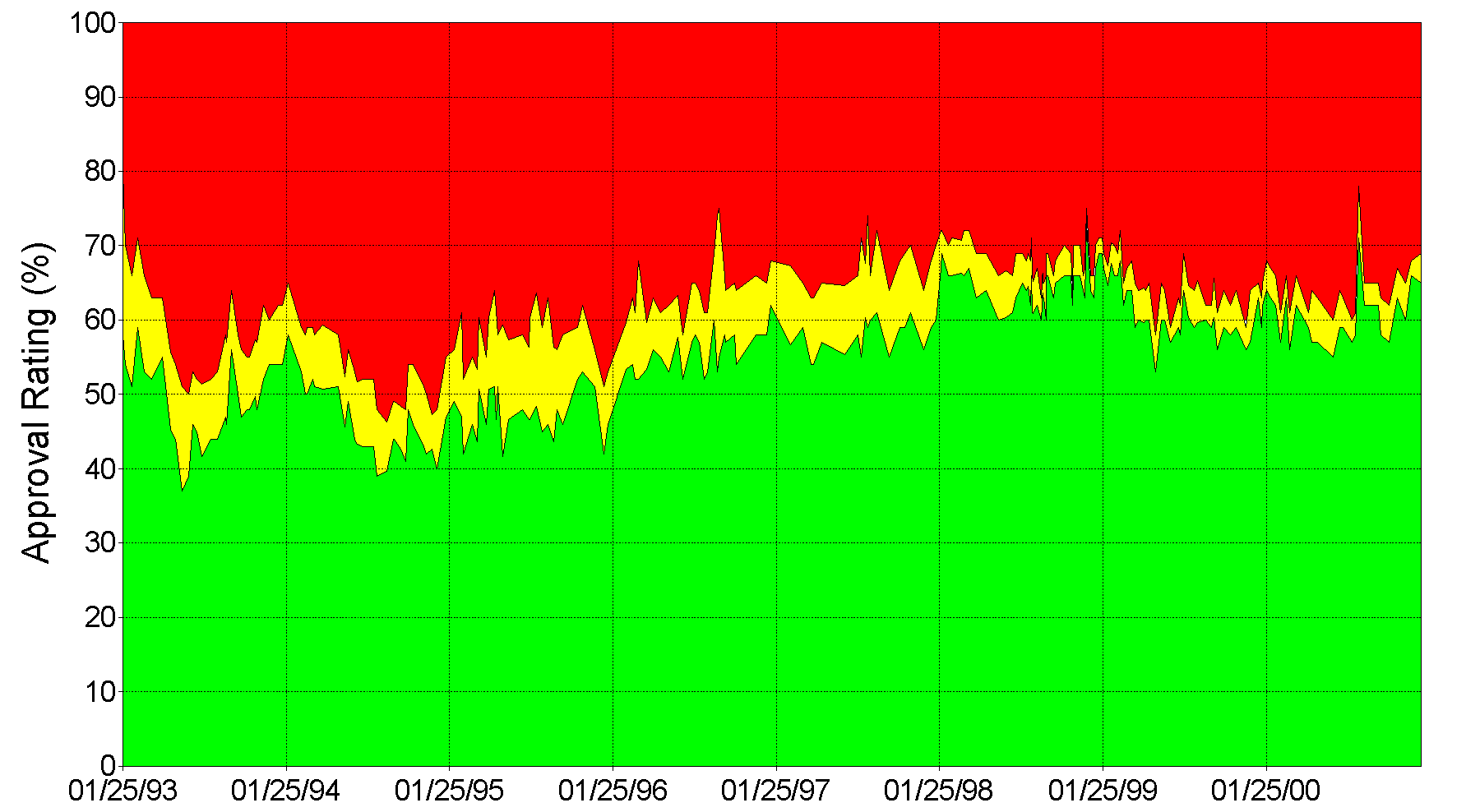
Graph of Clinton's approval ratings in Gallup polls

Polls of historians and political scientists have generally ranked Clinton as an above-average president. A 2017 C-SPAN poll of historians ranked Clinton as the 15th best president. A 2018 poll of the American Political Science Association's Presidents and Executive Politics section ranked Clinton as the 13th best president.

Clinton's "third way" of moderate liberalism built up the nation's fiscal health, resisted Republican attacks, and put the nation on a firm footing abroad amid globalization and the development of anti-American terrorist organizations.

Addressing Clinton's legacy, Russell L. Riley writes:

Clinton managed to remake the image and operations of the Democratic Party in ways that effectively undermined the so-called Reagan Revolution. His "New Democrat" Party co-opted the Reagan appeal to law and order, individualism, and welfare reform, and made the party more attractive to white middle-class Americans. At the same time, the reborn party retained traditional Democratic commitments to providing for the disadvantaged, regulating the excesses of the private market place, supporting minorities and women, and using government to stimulate economic growth. Moreover, Clinton capitalized on growing dissatisfaction with far right-wing extremism within the Republican Party. Nevertheless, Clinton's claims to a lasting, positive legacy for the Democratic Party have been severely undermined by two realities: the shift in control of Congress to the Republican Party on his watch and the loss by his would-be successor, Vice President Al Gore, in the 2000 presidential election. Thus, Clinton's partisan legacy remains complex and uncertain.

== See also ==
- Clinton Presidential Center
- Efforts to impeach Bill Clinton
- Presidency of Bill Clinton (category)
- Environmental policy of the United States during the Clinton administration

== Works cited ==
- Gormley, Ken (2016). "Bill Clinton". In Gormley, Ken (ed.). The Presidents and the Constitution: A Living History. New York: New York University Press. ISBN 9781479839902.
- Harris, John F. (2005). The Survivor: Bill Clinton in the White House. New York: Random House. ISBN 0-375-50847-3.
- Herring, George C. (2008). From Colony to Superpower; U.S. Foreign Relations Since 1776. Oxford University Press. ISBN 978-0-19-507822-0.
- Leshy, John D. "The Babbitt Legacy at the Department of the Interior: A Preliminary View." Environmental Law 31 (2001): 199–227 online
- Palmer, David. "'What Might Have Been'--Bill Clinton and American Political Power." Australasian Journal of American Studies (2005): 38–58. online, summarizes scholarly studies
- Patterson, James T. (2005). Restless Giant: The United States from Watergate to Bush v. Gore. Oxford University Press. ISBN 978-0195122169.
- Stephanopoulos, George (1999). All Too Human: A Political Education. Boston: Little, Brown and Company. ISBN 0-316-92919-0.
- Troy, Gil (2015). The Age of Clinton: America in the 1990s. Thomas Dunne Books. ISBN 9781250063724.
- Wilentz, Sean (2008). The Age of Reagan. HarperCollins. ISBN 978-0-06-074480-9.
- Woodward, Bob (2000). Maestro. New York: Simon & Schuster.
- Yeaman, Helena (2010). "The Bipartisan Roots of the Financial Services Crisis". Political Science Quarterly. 124 (4): 681–696. doi:10.1002/j.1538-165X.2009.tb00663.x. JSTOR 25655743.
