= Asset-based economy =

Economy where growth is based on appreciation of assets

The asset-based economy is a post-industrial macroeconomic state of capitalism in which growth is based largely on appreciation of equity assets, typically instruments such as company shares, as well as real estate.

The term has been applied, often in a derogatory sense, to the economic conditions in the United States in the 2000s, during the recovery from the bursting of the dot-com bubble.

== Overview ==
In an asset-based economy, manufacturing, as well as perhaps services, no longer provide the engine for growth. Rather the appreciation of assets leads to an increased net worth among individuals which, in the direct sense, can serve as collateral for borrowing, which in turn creates greater demand for goods and services. Proponents of the model often advocate reduction of tax rates in order to stimulate greater demand for assets, which in turn raises asset prices yielding even greater equity.

Critics of the asset-based economy contend that it is highly flawed because it depends on the continuation of low interest rates to stimulate the borrowing that will finance the purchase of assets at a rate sufficient to sustain the upward trend in asset prices. Thus, they reason, the model is highly vulnerable to the perhaps inevitable decreases in the real estate and financial markets.

Defenders of the model argue that the asset-based model need not be a permanent condition, but can be viewed as a stop-gap measure until demand for goods and services increases enough to sustain growth without low interest rates.

== See also ==
- New Economy
- Deindustrialization
