= New economy =

Development of economic theory

The New Economy refers to the ongoing development of the American economic system. It evolved from the notions of the classical economy via the transition from a manufacturing-based economy to a service-based economy, and has been driven by new technology and innovations. This popular use of the term emerged during the dot-com bubble of the late 1990s, where high growth, low inflation, and high employment of this period led to optimistic predictions and flawed business plans.

== Origins ==
A 1983 cover article in Time, "The New Economy", described the transition from heavy industry to a new technology based economy. By 1997, Newsweek was referring to the "new economy" in many of its articles.

After a nearly 25-year period of unprecedented growth, the United States experienced a much discussed economic slowdown beginning in 1972. However, around 1995, U.S. economic growth accelerated, driven by faster productivity growth. From 1972 to 1995, the growth rate of output per hour, a measure of labor productivity, had only averaged around one-percent per year. But by the mid 1990s, growth became much faster: 2.65 percent from 1995–99. America also experienced increased employment and decreasing inflation. The economist Robert J. Gordon referred to this as a Goldilocks economy—-the result of five positive "shocks"—–"the two traditional shocks (food-energy and imports) and the three new shocks (computers, medical care, and measurement)".

Other economists pointed to the ripening benefits of the computer age, being realized after a delay much like that associated with the delayed benefits of electricity shortly after the turn of the twentieth century. Gordon contended in 2000, that the benefits of computers were marginal or even negative for the majority of firms, with their benefits being consolidated in the computer hardware and durable goods manufacturing sectors, which only represent a relatively small segment of the economy. His method relied on applying considerably sized gains in the business cycle to explain aggregate productivity growth.

According to the generally unaccepted Kondratiev wave theory of economy growth, the "new economy" is a current Kondratiev wave which will end after a 50-year period in the 2040s. Its innovative basis includes Internet, nanotechnologies, telematics and bionics.

== New kinds of companies ==
- Online retailers
- Crowdfunding web sites
- Mass customization manufacturers – 3D printing, design-your-own web sites for sneakers, clothing
- Social media
- Sharing economy companies
  - Bicycle sharing system
  - Carsharing and short-term rental companies such as Zipcar
  - Ridesharing companies such as Lyft, Uber, Haxi, and Bridj
  - Garden sharing
  - Peer-to-peer lending of money
  - Short term property rental companies such as Airbnb
- Online media companies, such as Netflix
- Online dating services
- Online advertising, from free classifieds like craigslist to paid-placement like Google AdWords

== See also ==
- Asset-based economy
- Long tail
- Knowledge economy
- Information revolution
- Deindustrialization
- Post-industrial economy
