= Great Moderation =

Phenomenon in economies of developed nations since the mid-1980s

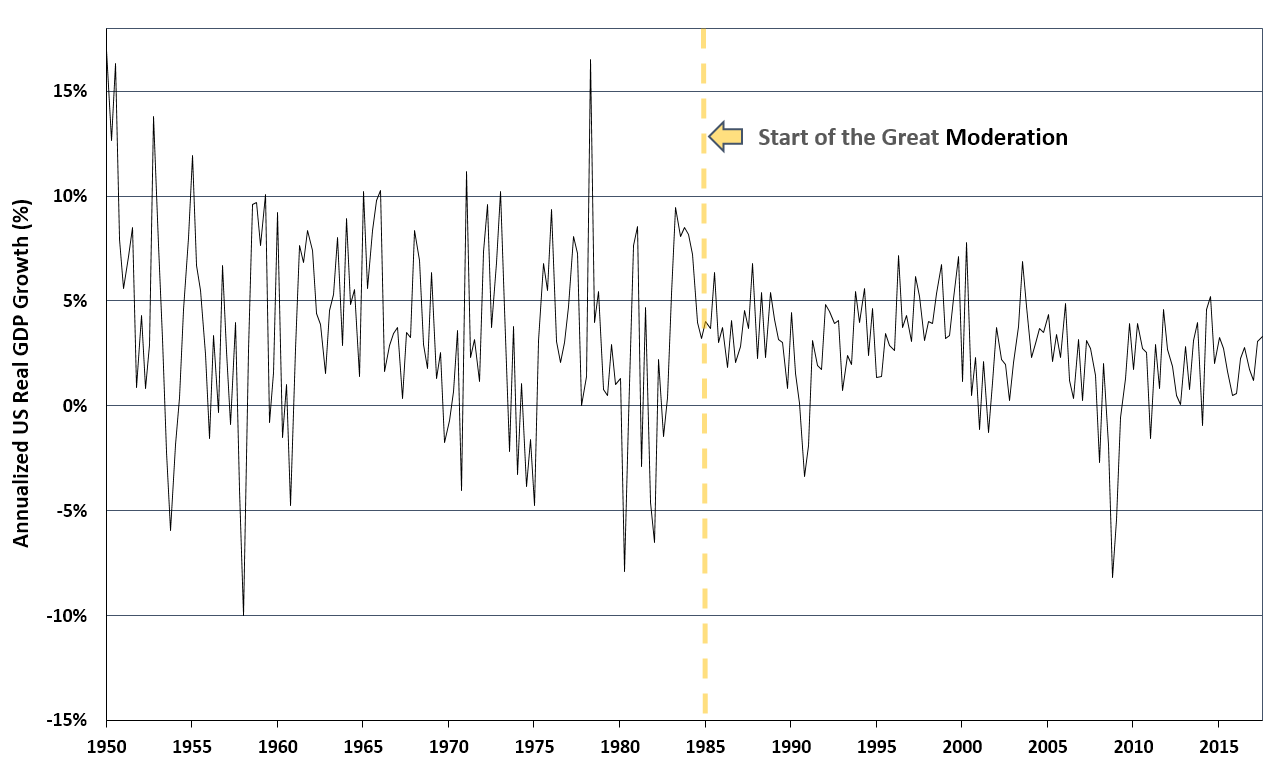
US annualized real GDP growth from 1950 to 2016

The Great Moderation was a period of macroeconomic stability in the United States coinciding with the rise of central bank independence, beginning with the Volcker shock in 1980 and continuing through the 21st century. It is characterized by generally milder business cycle fluctuations in developed nations, compared with decades before. Throughout this period, major economic variables such as real GDP growth, industrial production, unemployment, and price levels have become less volatile, while average inflation has fallen and recessions have become less common.

The Great Moderation is typically attributed to the adoption of standards for macroeconomic targeting such as the Taylor rule and inflation targeting. However, some economists argue technological shifts also played a role.

The term was coined in 2002 by James H. Stock and Mark Watson to describe the observed reduction in business cycle volatility. There is some debate as to whether the Great Moderation ended with the 2008 financial crisis and the accompanying Great Recession, or if it continued beyond this date, with the crisis being an anomaly.

== Origins of the term ==
The term "Great Moderation" was coined by James Stock and Mark Watson in their 2002 paper "Has the Business Cycle Changed and Why?" It was brought to the attention of the wider public by Ben Bernanke (then member and later chairman of the Board of Governors of the Federal Reserve) in a speech at the 2004 meetings of the Eastern Economic Association.

== Causes ==
=== Central bank independence ===
Since the Treasury–Fed Accord of 1951, the US Federal Reserve was freed from government and gave way to the development of modern monetary policy. According to John B. Taylor, this allowed the Federal Reserve to abandon discretionary macroeconomic policy by the US Federal government to set new goals that would better benefit the economy.

=== Taylor Rule ===
The Taylor rule results in less policy instability, which should reduce macroeconomic volatility. The rule prescribes setting the bank rate based on three main indicators: the federal funds rate, the price level and the changes in real income. The Taylor rule also prescribes economic activity regulation by choosing the federal funds rate based on the inflation gap between desired (targeted) inflation rate and actual inflation rate; and the output gap between the actual and natural level.

In an American Economic Review paper, Troy Davig and Eric Leeper stated that the Taylor principle is countercyclical in nature and a "very simple rule [that] does a good job of describing Federal Reserve interest-rate decisions". They argued that it is designed for "keeping the economy on an even keel", and that following the Taylor principle can produce business cycle stabilization and crisis stabilization.

However, since the 2000s the actual interest rate in advanced economies, especially in the US, was below that suggested by the Taylor rule.

=== Structural economic changes ===
A change in economic structure shifted away from manufacturing, an industry considered less predictable and more volatile. The Sources of the Great Moderation by Bruno Coric supports the claim of drastic labor market changes, noting a high "increase in temporary workers, part time workers and overtime hours". In addition to a change in the labor market, there were behavioral changes in how corporations managed their inventories. With improved sales forecasting and inventory management, inventory costs became much less volatile, increasing corporation stability.

==== Technology ====
Advances in information technology and communications increased the efficiency of corporations by changing the entire way they managed their resources. With inventions such as the barcode, information became much more readily available to corporation management.

These advances led to the introduction of "just-in-time" inventory practices. As demand and inventory became easier to track, corporations were able to reduce stocks of inventory and their carrying costs, both of which resulted in much less output volatility.

=== Luck ===
Researchers at the US Federal Reserve and the European Central Bank have rejected the "good luck" explanation, and attribute it mainly to monetary policies. Many large economic crises such as the Latin American debt crisis, the failure of Continental Illinois in 1984, Black Monday (1987), the 1997 Asian financial crisis, the collapse of Long-Term Capital Management in 1998, and the dot-com bubble in 2000 did not greatly destabilize the US economy during the Great Moderation.

Stock and Watson used a four variable vector autoregression model to analyze output volatility and concluded that stability increased due to economic good luck. Stock and Watson believed that it was pure luck that the economy didn't react violently to the economic shocks during the Great Moderation. While there were numerous economic shocks, there is very little evidence that these shocks are as large as prior economic shocks.

== Effects ==
Research has indicated that the US monetary policy that contributed to the drop in the volatility of US output fluctuations also contributed to the decoupling of the business cycle from household investments characterized the Great Moderation. The latter became the toxic assets that caused the Great Recession.

According to Hyman Minsky the great moderation enabled a classic period of financial instability, with stable growth encouraging greater financial risk taking.

== End ==
It is now commonly assumed that the 2008 financial crisis and the Great Recession brought the Great Moderation period to an end, as was initially argued by some economists such as John Quiggin. Richard Clarida at PIMCO considered the Great Moderation period to have been roughly between 1987 and 2007, and characterized it as having "predictable policy, low inflation, and modest business cycles".

However, before the COVID-19 pandemic, the US real GDP growth rate, the real retail sales growth rate, and the inflation rate had all returned to roughly what they were before the Great Recession. Todd Clark has presented an empirical analysis which claims that volatility, in general, has returned to the same level as before the Great Recession. He concluded that while severe, the 2007 recession will in future be viewed as a temporary period with a high level of volatility in a longer period where low volatility is the norm, and not as a definitive end to the Great Moderation.

However, the decade following Great Recession had some key differences with the economy of the Great Moderation. The economy had a much larger debt overhead. This led to a much slower economic recovery, the slowest since the Great Depression. Despite the low volatility of the economy, few would argue that the 2009-2020 economic expansion, which was the longest on record, was carried out under Goldilocks economic conditions. Andrea Riquier dubs the post-Great Recession period as the "Great Stability".

== See also ==
- Great Depression of the 1930s
- 1990s United States boom
- Early 2000s recession
- New economy
- Structural break
