= 1990s United States boom =

Economic expansion in the United States in the 1990s

The U.S. federal budget from 1990 to 2000. Public debt as a percentage of GDP declined during the presidency of Bill Clinton. A combination of reduced defense spending and the Omnibus Budget Reconciliation Act of 1993 eventually led to four consecutive balanced budgets from 1998 to 2001, and a budget surplus of $236.2 billion by the end of 2000.

The 1990s economic boom in the United States was a major economic expansion that lasted between 1993 and 2001. It began following the early 1990s recession during the presidency of George H.W. Bush, and ended during the stock market downturn of 2002.

Several factors contributed to the economic growth of the decade. Following the collapse of the Soviet Union, the United States reduced its defense spending, which, combined with the fiscal policy priorities of the Clinton administration, led to balanced budgets in four consecutive fiscal years from 1998 to 2001. The Omnibus Budget Reconciliation Act of 1993 increased top marginal tax rates while placing limits on federal spending, leading to deficit reduction. The Balanced Budget Act of 1997 further limited spending, and a balanced budget was achieved by 1998. Household income exceeded inflation, however real wage growth lagged despite an increase in new private sector jobs. Free trade policies and declining union membership also had an effect on relatively modest wage growth during this period. Conversely, corporate profits reached record highs, with the S&P 500 crossing over 1,500 points for the first time in August 2000.

Until July 2019, it was the longest recorded economic expansion in the history of the United States.

== Background ==
The 1990s are remembered as a time of strong economic growth, steady job creation, low inflation, rising productivity, economic boom, and a surging stock market that resulted from a combination of rapid technological changes and sound central monetary policy.

The prosperity of the 1990s was not evenly distributed over the entire decade. The economy was in recession from July 1990 - March 1991, having suffered the S&L Crisis in 1989, a spike in gas prices as the result of the Gulf War, and the general run of the business cycle since 1983. A surge in inflation in 1988 and 1989 forced the Federal Reserve to raise the discount rate to 8.00% in early 1990, restricting credit into the already-weakening economy. GDP growth and job creation remained weak through late-1992. Unemployment rose from 5.4% in January 1990 to 6.8% in March 1991, and continued to rise until peaking at 7.8% in June 1992. Approximately 1.621 million jobs were shed during the recession. As inflation subsided drastically, the Federal Reserve cut interest rates to a then-record low of 3.00% to promote growth.

For the first time since the Great Depression, the economy underwent a "jobless recovery," where GDP growth and corporate earnings returned to normal levels while job creation lagged, demonstrating the importance of the financial and service sectors in the national economy, having surpassed the manufacturing sector in the 1980s.

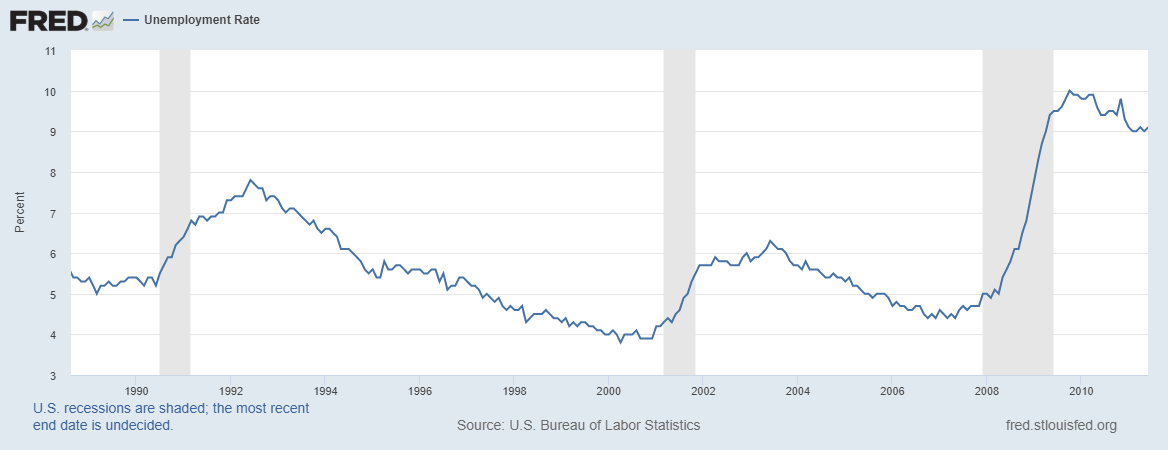
US unemployment rate, 1988–2011

Politically, the stagnant economy would doom President George H. W. Bush in the 1992 election, as Bill Clinton capitalized on economic frustration and voter fatigue after 12 years of Republican stewardship of the White House. Unemployment remained above 7% until July 1993, and above 6% until September 1994.

It was in the spring of 1994 where GDP growth surged and the number of jobs created (3.85 million) set a record that has yet to be surpassed as of 2015. But 1995 would bring a pause in economic growth, primarily because the Federal Reserve raised interest rates from 3% to 6% beginning in late 1994 to prevent inflation from rising after such rapid growth along with two government shutdowns that slowed the economy. The pause was short-lived, however, as the economy adjusted and the surge of investment in the Dot-Com bubble would jumpstart the economy beginning in late 1995. 1996 saw a return to steady growth, and in May 1997 unemployment fell below 5% for the first time since December 1973.

This prosperity, combined with the Omnibus Budget Reconciliation Act of 1990 and Omnibus Budget Reconciliation Act of 1993 (which raised taxes), and the Balanced Budget Act of 1997 (which cut spending), allowed the federal government to go from a $290 billion deficit in 1992 to a record $236.4 billion surplus in 2000. The reduction in government borrowing freed up capital in markets for businesses and consumers, causing interest rates on loans to fall creating a cycle that only reinforced growth. Government debt increased from $5.02 trillion in 1990 to $5.413 in 1997 and flatlined, barely increasing to $5.674 in 2000.

1995–2000 is also remembered for a series of global economic financial crises that threatened the U.S. economy: Mexico in 1995, Asia in 1997, Russia in 1998, and Argentina in 1999. Despite occasional stock market downturns and some distortions in the trade deficit, the US economy remained resilient until the dot-com bubble peaked in March 2000, after which was a recession a year later. The Federal Reserve had a hand in propping up the US economy by lowering interest rates to 4.75% by November 1998 to flood the world financial markets with dollars and prevent a global economic crisis as well as to restore confidence within the American economy which panicked during the height of the Asian financial crisis in 1997.

The easing of credit also coincided with spectacular stock market run-ups from 1999 to 2000. The NASDAQ, at less than 800 points in 1994, surged to over 5,000 in March 2000. The Dow Jones Industrial Index traded at roughly 3,000 points in 1990 and 4,000 in 1995, nearly tripled to over 11,000 by mid-2000.

== Proposed reasons for the boom ==
Possible reasons for the economic boom:

- The mid to late 1990s was characterized by significantly low oil prices (the lowest prices since the post-World War 2 economic boom), which would have reduced transportation and manufacturing costs, leading to increases in economic growth. The lowest price for oil during this entire period occurred in 1998.
- Reform of welfare enacted through the Personal Responsibility and Work Opportunity Act, which significantly reduced the amount of time individuals can stay on welfare and as a result, increased the labor force participation rate. Labor Force Participation Rates climbed to its highest level before starting to descend in the mid-2000s. Workfare was gaining more credibility among OECD member countries during this time.
- A more egalitarian tax structure, and the accompanying promotion of Third Way politics espoused by Bill Clinton and Tony Blair, which emphasizes a syncretic form of neoliberal politics along with improvements in social capital which aims to give the poor a "hand up" (not a handout), instead of relying on purely laissez faire policies and the purely leftist strains associated with the welfare state.
- New job growth created from the information revolution and the associated capital created from the Dot-com bubble.
- The enactment of NAFTA was thought to increase economic growth via improved comparative advantage, which reduced prices for traded goods.
- Increased productivity created from newly invented information technologies (computers; internet)
- A healthy dependency ratio when Baby Boomers were still working.
- A higher savings rate and thus more available credit and investment.
- The new generational bulge of Millennials (albeit less pronounced than the Baby Boomer generational bulge) would create a significant market dedicated for young people during this decade, increasing demand and consumer spending. This bulge was apparent in the early 1990s, when more Millennials were born.

None of these rationales for the 1990s economic boom should be seen as mutually exclusive.

== End of the boom ==
Despite the concerns, it was during this time that talk of a "New Economy" emerged, where inflation and unemployment were low and strong growth coincided. Some even spoke of the end of the business cycle, where economic growth was perpetual. In April 2000, unemployment dropped to 3.8%, and was below 4% September–December 2000. For the whole 1990-2000 period, roughly 23,672,000 jobs were created. Hourly wages had increased by a strong 10.1% since 1996. But by the fall, the economy began to run out of steam. The Federal Reserve hiked rates to 6.5% in May 2000, and it appeared by late-2000 that the business cycle was not eliminated, but was coming to a crest. Growth faltered, job creation slowed, the stock markets plunged, and the groundwork for the 2001 recession was being laid, thus ending the economic boom of the 1990s.

Year	GDP growth	Jobs created (millions)	Deficit/surplus	GDP (trillions)
1990	1.86%	0.311	-$221.2 billion	$5.5
1991	-0.26%	-0.858	-$269.3 billion	$5.9
1992	3.4%	1.154	-$290.4 billion	$6.3
1993	2.87%	2.788	-$255.1 billion	$6.6
1994	4.11%	3.851	-$203.2 billion	$7.1
1995	2.55%	2.153	-$164 billion	$7.4
1996	3.79%	2.794	-$107.5 billion	$7.8
1997	4.51%	3.355	-$22 billion	$8.3
1998	4.4%	3.002	$69.2 billion	$8.7
1999	4.87%	3.174	$125.6 billion	$9.3
2000	4.17%	1.948	$236.4 billion	$9.8

== Legacy ==
According to the National Bureau of Economic Research, the 1990s was the longest economic expansion in the history of the United States until the 2009–2020 expansion, lasting exactly ten years from March 1991 to March 2001. It was the best performance on all accounts since the 1961–1969 period. The importance and influence of the financial sector only grew, as demonstrated by the bursting of the Dot-Com Bubble in 2000 followed by a recession in 2001.

== See also ==
- The Californian Ideology
- Post–World War II economic expansion
- Technological utopianism

=== Contemporary economics ===
- New economy
- Great Moderation
- Dot-com bubble

=== Contemporary booms ===
- Baltic Tiger, shortly following
- Celtic Tiger, Ireland
- Miracle of Chile
