= Goldilocks economy =

Economy with moderate economic growth

A Goldilocks economy is an economy that is not too hot or cold, in other words sustains moderate economic growth, and that has low inflation, which allows a market-friendly monetary policy. The name comes from the children's story Goldilocks and the Three Bears.

== History ==
The first use of this phrase was by an unnamed U.S. government official in a 20 December 1966 article in The Wall Street Journal. It appeared in print again, in The Washington Post, on 8 January 1967, attributed to James S. Duesenberry of the Council of Economic Advisers.

The phrase was picked up in a few other publications shortly thereafter. It gained wider use after 1988 following an April column by Dan Andriacco of Scripps-Howard, and a November The New York Times article quoting Richard B. Berner of Salomon Brothers.

The phrase was popularized and reformulated by Salomon Brothers' chief equity strategist David Shulman by his March 1992 report "The Goldilocks Economy: Keeping the Bears at Bay."

Goldilocks economy is primarily used to describe the economic indicators of the Great Moderation: stable GDP growth, industrial production, monthly payroll employment, unemployment rate, real wages and consumer prices.

Michael Hudson argues that the positive connotations associated with the "Goldilocks economy" and the "Great Moderation" are because these terms were coined by bankers, who saw their loans soar along with their bonuses during this period. However, this economy was not "Goldilocks" for everyone. Indeed, during this period, the rich accumulated more wealth while the poor and middle class accumulated a tremendous amount of household debt.

In 2017, The Economist, citing a poll of global fund managers, suggested that the Goldilocks economy was returning; the post-Great Recession economic expansion starting in 2009 and ending when the economy crashed in 2020, (sometimes referred to as the "Great Austerity"), was posited by MarketWatch to be a return of the Goldilocks economy.
