= List of unsolved problems in economics =

This is a list of some of the major unsolved problems, puzzles, or questions in economics. Some of these are theoretical in origin and some of them concern the inability of orthodox economic theory to explain an empirical observation.

== Capital theory ==
- Cambridge capital controversy: The Cambridge capital controversy is a dispute in economics that started in the 1950s. The debate concerned the nature and role of capital goods and a critique of the neoclassical vision of aggregate production and distribution. The question of whether the natural growth rate is exogenous, or endogenous to demand (and whether it is input growth that causes output growth, or vice versa), lies at the heart of the debate. The resolution of the debate has not been agreed upon by economists.
- Transformation problem: The transformation problem is the problem specific to Marxist economics, and not to economics in general, of finding a general rule by which to transform the values of commodities based on socially necessary labour time into the competitive prices of the marketplace. The essential difficulty is how to reconcile profit in the form of surplus value from direct labour inputs and the ratio of direct labour input to capital input that vary widely between commodities, with the tendency toward an average rate of profit on all capital invested.

== Behavioral economics ==
- Revealed preference: Does revealed preference theory truly reveal consumer preference when the consumer is able to afford all of the available options? For example, if a consumer is confronted with three goods and they can afford to purchase all three (A, B, and C) and they choose to first purchase A, then C, and then B – does this suggest that the consumer preference for the goods is A > C > B? The debate rests on the fact that since the consumer can afford all three goods and does not need to make a preferential decision, does the order of consumption reflect any preference?
- Tâtonnement: The act of tâtonnement (trial-and-error) plays a key role in the formulation of general equilibrium theory. The claim is that if an initial contract does not lead to an equilibrium, it is ended and new contracts are formulated. If the initial contract is not called off, it will likely lead to a different set of prices, depending on the degree of error in the original process. The question is whether successive re-contracting continues with the parties forgetting the previously planned positions taken or whether the parties engage in a form of tâtonnement to achieve optimality. See also Hill climbing and Walrasian auction.
- Unified models of human biases: Neoclassical economics has concentrated on the development of models that reflect an idealized economic agent, sometimes referred to as Homo economicus, as a way of studying economics. In the period spanning the 1970s to the 1990s, research began to emerge that suggested that people were subject to cognitive biases such as the framing effect, loss aversion, the gambler's fallacy, confirmation bias, and many others. Further, these effects could produce anomalies such as herd behavior or momentum investing inconsistent with economic models that did not incorporate human psychological limitations. While some models have begun to include bounded rationality and risk aversion, such as prospect theory, there still remains to be seen a unified model that can make useful predictions that incorporates the entirety of cognitive biases and rational limitations in most humans. Further, there even exists debate as to whether it is necessary to incorporate such psychological limitations into economic models. While some economists insist they are necessary to fully appreciate the complexity of the market, others still contend that a model that incorporates human biases is either unrealistic or question its usefulness arguing that a model that doesn't approximate agents as being perfectly rational, with the possibility of minimal exceptions, is unlikely to be successful.

== Financial economics ==
- Equity premium puzzle: The equity premium puzzle is thought to be one of the most important outstanding questions in neoclassical economics. It is founded on the basis that over the last one hundred years or so the average real return to stocks in the US has been substantially higher than that of bonds. The puzzle lies in explaining the causes behind this equity premium. While there are a number of different theories regarding the puzzle, there still exists no definitive agreement on its cause.
- Dividend puzzle: The dividend puzzle is the empirically observed phenomenon that companies that pay dividends tend to be rewarded by investors with higher valuations. At present, there is no explanation widely accepted by economists. The Modigliani–Miller theorem suggests that the puzzle can (only) be explained by some combination of taxes, bankruptcy costs, market inefficiency (including that due to investor psychology), and asymmetric information.
- Improved Black–Scholes and binomial options pricing models: The Black–Scholes model and the more general binomial options pricing models are a collection of equations that seek to model and price equity and call options. While the models are widely used, they have many significant limitations. Chief among them are the model's inability to account for historical market movements and their frequent overpricing of options, with the overpricing increasing with the time to maturity. The development of a model that can properly account for the pricing of call options on an asset with stochastic volatility is considered an open problem in financial economics.

== International economics ==
- Home bias in trade puzzle: The home bias in trade puzzle is an empirical observation that even when factors such as economic size of trading partners and the distance between them are considered, trade between regions within a given country is substantially greater than trade between regions in different countries, even when there are no substantial legal barriers. There is currently no framework to explain this observation.
- Equity home bias puzzle: This puzzle concerns the observation that individuals and institutions in many countries only hold modest amounts of foreign equity, despite the ability for vast diversification of their portfolios in the global economy. While some explanations do exist, such as that local individuals and firms have greater access to information about local firms and economic conditions, these explanations are not accepted by the majority of economists and have been mostly refuted.
- Backus–Kehoe–Kydland puzzle: The Backus–Kehoe–Kydland consumption correlation puzzle is the empirical observation that consumption is much less correlated across countries than output. Standard economic theory suggests that country-specific output risks should be collective and domestic consumption growth should not depend strongly on country-specific income shocks. Thus, we should not see the observation that consumption is much less correlated across countries than output; and yet we do.
- Feldstein–Horioka puzzle: The Feldstein-Horioka puzzle originates from an article in the 1980s that found that among OECD countries, averages of long-term national savings rates are highly correlated with similar averages of domestic investment rates. Standard economic theory suggests that in relatively open international financial markets, the savings of any country would flow to countries with the most productive investment opportunities; hence, saving rates and domestic investment rates would be uncorrelated, contrary to the empirical evidence suggested by Martin Feldstein and Charles Horioka. While numerous articles regarding the puzzle have been published, none of the explanations put forth have adequate empirical support.
- PPP Puzzle: The PPP puzzle, considered one of the two real exchange rate puzzles, concerns the observation that real exchange rates are both more volatile and more persistent than most models would suggest. The only clear way to understand this volatility would be to assign substantial roles to monetary and financial shocks. However, if shocks play such a large role the challenge becomes finding what source, if one even exists, of nominal rigidity that could be so persistent to explain the long-term prolonged nature of real exchange rate deviations.
- The exchange rate disconnect puzzle: The exchange rate disconnect puzzle, also one of the so-called real exchange rate puzzles, concerns the weak short-term feedback link between exchange rates and the rest of the economy. In most economies, the exchange rate is the most important relative price, so it is surprising, and thus far unexplained entirely, that the correlations are not stronger.

== Economic anthropology ==
- Formalist–substantivist debate: The opposition between substantivist and formalist economic models was first proposed by Karl Polanyi in his work The Great Transformation (1944). Formalists such as Raymond Firth and Harold K. Schneider asserted that the neoclassical model of economics could be applied to any society if appropriate modifications are made, arguing that its principles have universal validity. Critics of the formalist position question its central assumptions, in particular that the universality of rational choice and utility maximization can be assumed across all cultures.
