= Economic puzzle =

Mismatch between economic theory and observation

In economics, a puzzle is a situation where the implication of theory is inconsistent with observed economic data.

An example is the equity premium puzzle, which relates to the fact that over the last two hundred years, the risk premium of stocks over bonds has been around 5.5%, much larger than expected from theory. The equity premium puzzle was first documented by Mehra and Prescot (1985).

== List of puzzles ==
- Consumption correlations puzzle
- Equity premium puzzle
- Equity home bias puzzle
- Excess volatility puzzle
- Feldstein-Horioka puzzle
- Forward premium anomaly
- Home bias in trade puzzle
- Low volatility anomaly
- Real exchange rate puzzles
- Retirement-consumption puzzle
- Missing trade puzzle, also known as Border puzzle
