= Peso problem =

The peso problem in finance is a problem which arises when "the possibility that some infrequent or unprecedented event may occur affects asset prices". The difficulty or impossibility of predicting such an event creates problems in modeling the economy and financial markets by using the past.

It is useful in various contexts, in particular, in analyzing the forward premium anomaly.

== History ==
The precise origin of the term is unknown, but it is generally attributed to Milton Friedman. Mexico in the 1970s, had pegged the Mexican peso to the US dollar, a peg which had held for more than 20 years. Friedman noted the large gap between the interest rate on Mexican bank deposits and the interest rate on comparable US bank deposits. Friedman reasoned that interest differential reflected concern in the market that the peso would be devalued. This was eventually realized in 1976 when the peso, allowed to float, fell 46 percent.

Since the currency value had been pegged for a long time, the differential in interest rate looked like an anomaly or flaw in financial markets – an investor could exploit the difference by simple currency conversion and make a profit from the arbitrage opportunity. The anomaly could be explained once the possibility of a large drop in the value of the peso is admitted.

The empirical work first discussing this was by Kenneth Rogoff in 1977 which was part of his Ph.D. dissertation. The first treatment in academic literature was by Krasker in 1980. A variant of the peso problem argument, which pertained to the discrete shift of a devaluation, is that excess profits during the initial period get competed away, indicating gradual market efficiency. In the early 80s, the forward dollar mark exchange rate predicted a depreciating spot dollar which, however kept rising. In sync with peso problem arguments, Lewis (1989) found that the forecast errors implied by the empirical learning model are significantly correlated with forward prediction errors and appear to account for roughly one half of the underprediction of the dollar.

However other studies have found strong evidence to the contrary. Moorthy (1996) simulated the profits from a trading rule based on the response of the Eurodollar interest rate futures contract to monthly U.S. employment news. The peso problem and learning process explanation implies that profits will reduce over time compared to the initial learning period. However, in this study the average profits per trade during 1988-1993 were about four times larger during 1985-1987, the initial period, indicating that excess profits did not decline over time.

== See also ==
- Economic puzzle
- Real exchange-rate puzzles
- Equity premium puzzle
