= Rare disaster =

Large and rare economic collapse

In economics, a rare disaster is a collapse that is infrequent and large in magnitude, having a negative effect on an economy. Rare disasters are important because they provide an explanation of the equity premium puzzle, the behavior of interest rates, and other economic phenomena.

The parameters for a rare disaster are a substantial drop in GDP and at least a 10% decrease in consumption. Examples include financial disasters: the Great Depression and the 1997 Asian financial crisis; wars: World War I, World War II, and regional conflicts; epidemics: influenza outbreaks and the Asian Flu; weather events; and earthquakes and tsunamis; however, any event that has a substantial impact on GDP and consumption could be considered a rare disaster.

The idea was first proposed by Rietz in 1988, as a way to explain the equity premium puzzle. Since then, other economists have added to and strengthened the idea with evidence, but many economists are still skeptical of the theory.

== Model ==
The model set forth by Barro is based upon the Lucas's fruit tree model of asset pricing with exogenous, stochastic production. The economy is closed, the number of trees is fixed, output equals consumption ( A _{t + 1} = C _{t} ) and there is no investment or depreciation. As ( A _{t + 1} ) is the output of all the trees in the economy and ( ${P_t}$ ) is the price of the periods fruit (the equity claim). The equation below shows the gross return on the fruit tree in one period.

$$R=\frac{A_{t+1}}{P_{t1}}$$

In order to model rare disasters, Barro introduces the equation below, which is a stochastic process for aggregate output growth. In the model, there are three types of economic shocks:

a.) Normal iid shocks
b.) Type ($\tilde{w}_{t+1}$) disasters which involve sharp contractions in output, but no default on debt.
c.) Type ($\tilde{v}$) disasters which involve sharp contractions in output and at least a partial default on debt.

$$\log A_{t+1} = \log A_t + \bar{g} + \tilde{u}_{t+1}+\tilde{v}_{t+1}$$

The type ω ($\tilde{v}_{t+1}$) models low probability disasters and ($\tilde{u}_{t+1}$) is a random iid variable. They are assumed to be independent so they are interchangeable in the equation. Then from the above equation, the magnitude of the contraction from ($\tilde{v}_{t+1}$) is determined by the following equation.

$$\begin{cases}
1 & (e^{-p})\mbox{ no disaster} \\
1-b & (1-e^{-p})\mbox{ disaster} \\
\end{cases}$$

In this equation, p is the probability per unit of time that a disaster will occur in each period. If the disaster occurs, b is the factor by which consumption will shrink. The model requires a p that is small and a b that large to correctly model rare disasters. In Barro's analysis, d is also used to deal with the problem of the partial default on bonds.

== Applications ==
Since Rietz and Barro, the rare disaster framework can be used to explain many events in finance and economics.

=== Equity premium ===
Much of the equity premium puzzle can be explained by the rare disaster scenarios proposed by Barro and Rietz. The basic reasoning is that if people are aware that rare disasters (i.e. the Great Depression or World War I and World War II) may occur, but the disaster never occurs during their lives, then the equity premium will appear high.

Barro and subsequent economists have provided historical evidence to support this claim. Using this evidence, Barro shows that rare disasters occur frequently and in large magnitude, in economies around the world from a period from the mid-19th century to the present day.

Further, the evidence shows that in the long run the risk premium is around 5.0% in most countries. However, when looking at specific periods of time this premium may be higher or lower. For example, if a data set of the period of the Great Depression is observed, then the equity premium will be about 0.4%, because the Great Depression was a rare disaster.

=== Risk-free interest rate behavior ===
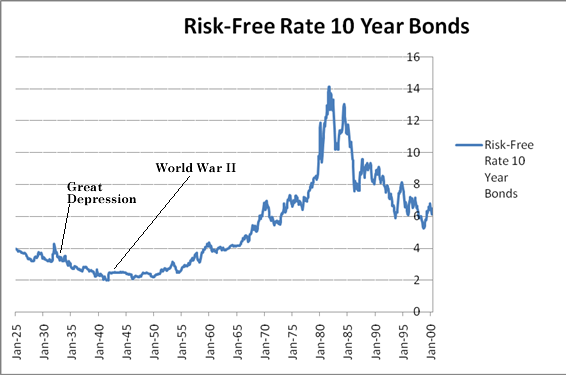

The risk-free interest rate (the interest received on fixed income, like bonds issued by extremely safe entities, typically governments) may also be explained by rare disasters. Using data in the United States, the rare disaster model shows that the risk-free rate falls by a large margin (from 0.127 to 0.035) when a rare disaster with the probability of 0.017 is introduced into the data set.

Furthermore, Barro defends the criticisms about the behavior of the risk free rate raised by Mehra with respect to the Great Depression and events such as dropping the Atom Bomb in World War II. He reasons that two effects go into people's expectation of rare disasters-the probability of a rare disaster and the probability of default. In an event that has the possibility of nuclear war (like the Cuban Missile Crisis or World War II), the probability of a disaster would rise and therefore, decrease interest rates. However, the probability of government default on bonds also increases, because of the possible destruction of countries, which raises the rate on bonds. These two forces counteract which leads to ambiguity. As shown left with the risk free rate rising before and falling after the Great Depression, then falling initially during World War II and then rising afterward.

== History ==
Edward C. Prescott and Rajnish Mehra first proposed the equity premium puzzle in 1985. In 1988, Rietz suggested that large and infrequent economic shocks could explain the equity premium (the premium of equity securities over fixed income assets). However, it was not deemed feasible at the time, because it seemed that such events were too rare and could not occur in reality. The theory was forgotten until 2005, when Robert Barro provided evidence of nations from around the world from the 19th and 20th century, showing that these events were possible and have happened. Since his papers, others have submitted different ideas regarding rare disasters' impact on other economic phenomenon. However, many economists remain skeptical of how much rare disasters really explain the equity premium and Mehra still expresses doubt as to the validity of the theory.

== Controversy ==
Rajnish Mehra was skeptical of Reitz's claim that rare disasters explain the equity premium and real interest rate behavior, because the rare disaster that Rietz had specified had never occurred in the U.S. Rietz suggested 25 to 97% drops, but this has never happened in the United States. Even if this were true, there are several other flaws regarding his model, parameters, and supporting evidence. The model Rietz presented did not compensate for a partial default on bond holders due to rapid inflation. Further, the risk aversion parameter was used inconsistently in his analysis. For example, a value of 10 was used to show a 25% drop in consumption, but a value of 1 is used to explain stock returns and consumption. Finally, more historical evidence was said to have been needed to give the theory proper support. For example, the perceived probability of a rare disaster should have been low before the atomic bomb was dropped and must have been higher before the Cuban Missile Crisis than after. Therefore, real interest rates should have correlated with these events, but they did not. Mehra concluded that Rietz's scenario was far too extreme to resolve the puzzle.

== See also ==
- Excess volatility puzzle
- Rare events
