= Low-volatility anomaly =

Finance theory

In investing and finance, the low-volatility anomaly is the observation that low-volatility securities have higher returns than high-volatility securities in most markets studied. In other words, assets whose prices or returns change wildly pay worse than assets whose prices or returns are steady. This is an example of a stock market anomaly since it contradicts the central prediction of many financial theories that investors demand higher returns for taking on more risk.

The capital asset pricing model (CAPM) predicts a positive and linear relation between the systematic risk exposure of a security (its beta) and its expected future return. However, the low-volatility anomaly falsifies this prediction of the CAPM by showing that higher beta stocks have historically underperformed lower beta stocks. Additionally, stocks with higher idiosyncratic risk often yield lower returns compared to those with lower idiosyncratic risk. The anomaly is also documented within corporate bond markets.

The low-volatility anomaly has also been referred to as the low-beta, minimum-variance, and minimum volatility anomaly. Each of these use a different approach to dividing stocks into high and low volatility (low-volatility focused on absolute performance, low-beta on performance relative to the stock market as a whole, and minimum variance on sets of stocks).

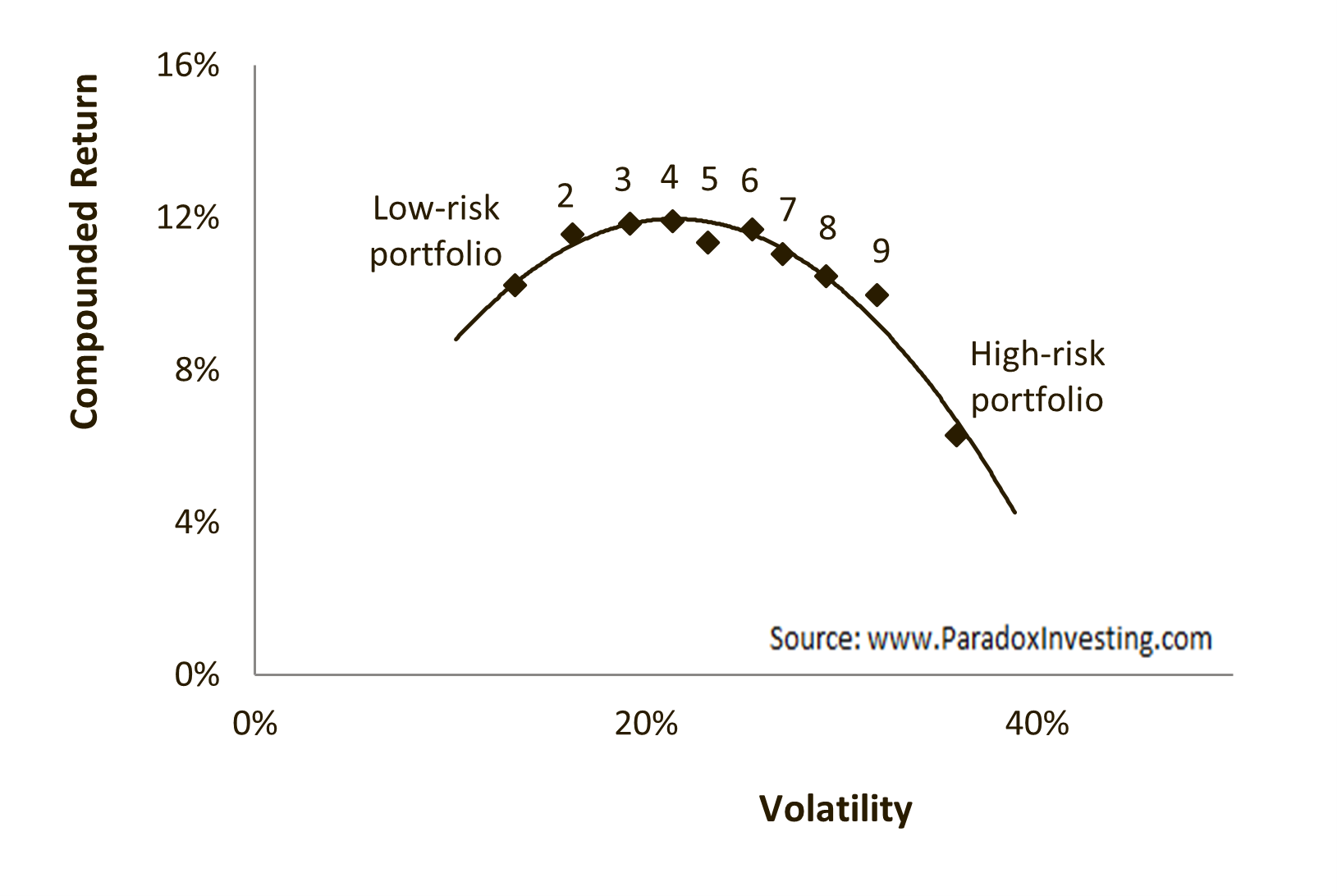
Portfolios sorted on volatility: US stock market 1929–2023.

== History ==
The CAPM was developed in the late 1960s and predicts that expected returns should be a positive and linear function of beta, and nothing else. First, the return of a stock with average beta should be the average return of stocks. Second, the intercept should be equal to the risk-free rate. Then the slope can be computed from these two points. Almost immediately these predictions were empirically challenged. Studies find that the correct slope is either less than predicted, not significantly different from zero, or even negative. Economist Fischer Black (1972) proposed a theory where there is a zero-beta return which is different from the risk-free return. This fits the data better. It still presumes, on principle, that there is higher return for higher beta. Research challenging CAPM's underlying assumptions about risk has been mounting for decades. One challenge was in 1972, when Michael C. Jensen, Fischer Black and Myron Scholes published a study showing what CAPM would look like if one could not borrow at a risk-free rate. Their results indicated that the relationship between beta and realized return was flatter than predicted by CAPM. Shortly after, Robert Haugen and James Heins produced a working paper titled "On the Evidence Supporting the Existence of Risk Premiums in the Capital Market". Studying the period from 1926 to 1971, they concluded that "over the long run stock portfolios with lesser variance in monthly returns have experienced greater average returns than their 'riskier' counterparts".

== Evidence ==
The low-volatility anomaly has been documented in the United States over an extended 90-year period. Volatility-sorted portfolios containing deep historical evidence since 1929 are available in an online data library. The picture contains portfolio data for US stocks sorted on past volatility and grouped into ten portfolios. The portfolio of stocks with the lowest volatility has a higher return compared to the portfolio of stocks with the highest volatility. A visual illustration of the anomaly, since the relation between risk and return should be positive. Data for the related low-beta anomaly is also online available. The evidence of the anomaly has been mounting due to numerous studies by both academics and practitioners which confirm the presence of the anomaly throughout the fifty years since its initial discovery in 1972. The low-volatility anomaly is found across sectors, but also within every sector. There are multiple examples. Besides evidence for the US stock market, there is also evidence for international stock markets. Similar results are found in global equity markets.

== Explanations ==
Several explanations have been put forward to explain the low-volatility anomaly. They explain why high-risk securities are more in demand creating the low-volatility anomaly.

- Constraints: Investors face leverage constraints and shorting constraints, so have to invest in riskier assets if they want to achieve high returns. For example, retail investors often increase their concentration in (high-volatility) stocks over (low-volatility) bonds instead of using leverage as Modern portfolio theory recommends. This explanation was put forward by Brennan (1971) and tested by Frazzini and Pedersen (2014).
- Relative performance: Many investors want to consistently beat the market average, or benchmark as discussed by Blitz and van Vliet (2007) and Baker, Bradley, and Wurgler (2011). Highly volatile assets seem like they could outperform, and less volatile assets do not.
- Agency issues: Many professional investors have misaligned interests when managing client money. For example, a money-manager who underperforms during a boom by choosing low-volatility assets may lose clients, even if those assets protect his remaining clients during a bust. A hedge-fund manager who gets a bonus when she makes a profit but no penalty when she makes a loss will be tempted to buy risky assets. Falkenstein (1996) and Karceski (2001) give evidence for mutual fund managers.
- Skewness preference: Many investors like lottery-like payoffs. Bali, Cakici and Whitelaw (2011) test the 'stocks as lotteries' hypothesis of Barberis and Huang (2008).
- Behavioral biases. Investors are often overconfident and use the representative heuristic and overpay for attention grabbing stocks.

For an overview of all explanations put forward in the academic literature see also the survey article on this topic by Blitz, Falkenstein, and Van Vliet (2014) and Blitz, Van Vliet, and Baltussen (2019).

== See also ==
- Market anomaly
- Capital asset pricing model
- Low-volatility investing
- Style investing
- Value investing
- Momentum investing
- Excess volatility puzzle
