= Backus–Kehoe–Kydland puzzle =

Economics puzzle

In economics, the Backus–Kehoe–Kydland consumption correlation puzzle, also known as the BKK puzzle, is the observation that consumption is much less correlated across countries than output.

== Statement ==
In an Arrow–Debreu economy, i.e. an economy with a complete set of state-contingent markets, country-specific output risks should be pooled and domestic consumption growth should not depend heavily on country-specific income shocks. So according to theory we should observe that consumption is much more correlated across countries than output. What Backus, Kehoe and Kydland found in their article from 1992 was the opposite, namely that consumption is much less correlated across countries than output.

Backus, Kehoe, and Kydland (1992) calculate the correlation of HP-filtered consumption and output for 11 advanced countries relative to the US. The measured average consumption correlation was .19, whereas the average output correlation was .31. Obstfeld and Rogoff (1996) reports average correlation of OECD countries with world consumption (35 “benchmark” countries) of .43, whereas the average OECD country’s output correlation with world benchmark is 0.52. The really puzzling part of these results is not that consumption levels are not perfectly correlated, but that they are less correlated than output. Apparently, there is hardly any risk sharing.

Obstfeld and Rogoff (2000) identifies this as one of the six major puzzles in international economics. The others are the home bias in trade puzzle, the equity home bias puzzle, the Feldstein-Horioka savings-investment correlations puzzle, the purchasing power and exchange rate disconnect puzzle, and the Baxter-Stockman neutrality of exchange rate regime puzzle. It is also related to the Backus-Smith consumption-real exchange rate puzzle.

== Attempts to account for the perceived anomaly ==
Stockman and Tesar (1995) suggests two means of breaking the link between prices and quantities and making it hard for households to smooth consumption by trade. The first is nontraded goods: Suppose households like to consume goods that cannot be traded, like some services. If there is a positive technology shock raising their supply, they can’t smooth their consumption of these goods by exporting them abroad. The second is "taste shocks": If consumption rises in one country without any change in the economic environment, it will borrow abroad, driving up the interest rate and inducing the foreign country to cut back on its consumption. So consumption could be negatively correlated across countries.
