= Real exchange-rate puzzles =

Two anomalies in economics

The real exchange-rate puzzles is a common term for two much-discussed anomalies of real exchange rates: that real exchange rates are more volatile and show more persistence than what most models can account for. These two anomalies are sometimes referred to as the purchasing power parity puzzles.

== Overview ==
Dornbusch's (1976) exchange rate overshooting hypothesis argued that exchange rate volatility is essentially driven by monetary shocks interacting with sticky prices. This model can account for real exchange rate volatility, but does not say anything about the volatility of relative to output or the persistence of the real exchange rate movements.

Chari, Kehoe and McGrattan (2002) showed how a model with two countries and where prices were only allowed to change once-a-year had the potential to simultaneously account for the volatility of U.S. output and real exchange rates.

These two anomalies are related to, but should not be confused with, the Backus-Smith consumption-real exchange rate anomaly, which is the observation that in most economic models the correlation between the real exchange rate and relative consumption is high and positive, whereas in the data it ranges from small and positive to negative.

Another real-exchange-rate anomaly was documented by Mussa (1986). In this paper Mussa documented that industrial countries which moved from fixed to floating exchange rate regimes experienced dramatic rises in nominal-exchange-rate volatility. Since the volatility increases much more than what can be accounted for by changes in the domestic price levels, it means that the real-exchange-rate volatility increases. This is sometimes referred to as the «Mussa puzzle».

== Findings ==
Obstfeld and Rogoff (2000) identified the purchasing power and exchange rate disconnect puzzle as one of the six major puzzles in international economics. These were the consumption correlation puzzle, home bias in trade puzzle, the equity home bias puzzle, the Feldstein-Horioka savings-investment correlations puzzle, and the exchange rate regime puzzle. The sixth puzzle is described as "why exchange rates are so volatile and apparently disconnected from fundamentals". Here Obstfeld and Rogoff (2000) quotes the Meese and Rogoff (1983) exchange rate forecasting puzzle and the Baxter and Stockman (1989) neutrality of exchange rate regime puzzle. These two puzzles are closely to the Mussa puzzle as well as the other real exchange rate puzzles.

== See also ==
- Equity premium puzzle
- Forward premium anomaly
- Rational pricing § Foreign exchange
