= Forward premium anomaly =

Foreign exchange market

The forward premium anomaly in currency markets (also referred to as the forward premium puzzle or the Fama puzzle) refers to the well documented empirical finding that the domestic currency appreciates when domestic nominal interest rates exceed foreign interest rates. This is perceived as puzzling in the context of the hypothesis that the expected future change in the exchange rate between two countries is equal to the interest-rate differential between these two countries; this hypothesis suggests that if all currencies are equally risky, investors would demand higher interest rates on currencies expected to fall in value. See Forward exchange rate § Unbiasedness hypothesis. Thus, appreciation of the domestic currency when domestic interest rates are greater than foreign interest rates is called an anomaly.

== See also ==
- Economic puzzle
- Real exchange-rate puzzles
- Equity premium puzzle
- Peso problem (finance)
