= Rare events =

Events unlikely to occur

One way of judging which events are extreme involves selecting events that exceed a certain threshold of intensity (or frequency, or impact, etc., not shown). This threshold might select events lying above a certain percentile or beyond a certain number of standard deviations above average. In the field of extreme event attribution, climate models then process the climate characteristics underlying the selected events for comparison to models of climates in which man-made climate drivers are excluded.

Rare events or extreme events occur with very low frequency, often without a regular periodicity, while having a widespread impact which might destabilize systems (for example, stock markets, ocean wave intensity or optical fibers or society). Rare events encompass natural phenomena (major earthquakes, tsunamis, hurricanes, floods, asteroid impacts, solar flares, etc.), anthropogenic hazards (warfare and related forms of violent conflict, acts of terrorism, industrial accidents, financial and commodity market crashes, etc.), as well as phenomena for which natural and anthropogenic factors interact in complex ways (epidemic disease spread, global warming-related changes in climate and weather, etc.).

== Overview ==
Rare or extreme events are discrete occurrences of infrequently observed events. Despite being statistically improbable, such events are plausible insofar as historical instances of the event (or a similar event) have been documented. Scholarly and popular analyses of rare events often focus on those events that could be reasonably expected to have a substantial negative effect on a society—either economically or in terms of human casualties (typically, both). Examples of such events might include an 8.0+ Richter magnitude earthquake, a nuclear incident that kills thousands of people, or a 10%+ single-day change in the value of a stock market index.

== Modeling and analysis ==
Since the industrial revolution, global warming has increased the frequency, intensity and impacts of weather events—heatwaves, hurricane winds, etc.(red vs blue curve). Accordingly, the number of extreme events is substantially greater today (red area) than in the pre-industrial era (yellow area). Per the field of extreme event attribution, the ratio of the red area to the yellow area is one expression of the increase in extreme events that is attributable to human-caused climate change.

Extreme event attribution methods generally involve applying climate change models to scenarios in both the "real" world that is experiencing global warming, and a simulated world that does not suffer the drivers of global warming. Differences between the results of the two processes—especially the frequency, intensity and impacts of extreme weather events—are then analyzed to arrive at the attribution result. Attribution to future extreme events (not shown in this graphic) are arrived at by applying climate models to scenarios of expected levels of future warming.

Rare event modeling (REM) refers to efforts to characterize the statistical distribution parameters, generative processes, or dynamics that govern the occurrence of statistically rare events, including but not limited to highly influential natural or human-made catastrophes. Such “modeling” may include a wide range of approaches, including, most notably, statistical models for analyzing historical event data and computational software models that attempt to simulate rare event processes and dynamics. REM also encompasses efforts to forecast the occurrence of similar events over some future time horizon, which may be of interest for both scholarly and applied purposes (e.g., risk mitigation and planning). Novel data collection techniques can be used for learning about rare events data.

Growing computing power of the 2000s allowed weather to be simulated over and over again, and conceptual breakthroughs in climate modeling in the early to mid 2010s enabled the field of extreme event attribution. The American Meteorological Society stated in 2016 that "the science has now advanced to the point that we can detect the effects of climate change on some events with high confidence".

== Relevant data sets ==
In many cases, rare and catastrophic events can be regarded as extreme-magnitude instances of more mundane phenomena. For example, seismic activity, stock market fluctuations, and acts of organized violence all occur along a continuum of extremity, with more extreme-magnitude cases being statistically more infrequent. Therefore, rather than viewing rare event data as its own class of information, data concerning "rare" events often exists as a subset of data within a broader parent event class (e.g., a seismic activity data set would include instances of extreme earthquakes, as well as data on much lower-intensity seismic events).

The following is a list of data sets focusing on domains that are of broad scholarly and policy interest, and where "rare" (extreme-magnitude) cases may be of particularly keen interest due to their potentially devastating consequences. Descriptions of the data sets are extracted from the source websites or providers.

=== Weather and climate ===
- The Sabin Center for Climate Change Law at Columbia University maintains searchable databases with categories: climate change attribution, extreme event attribution, impact attribution, source attribution, and attribution in the courts.
- Carbon Brief contains an interactive map including more than 600 studies covering almost 750 extreme weather events and trends.
- The American Meteorological Society publishes annual special collections, Explaining Extreme Events of [year] from a Climate Perspective.

=== Conflicts ===
- Armed Conflict Database: The Armed Conflict Database (ACD) monitors armed conflicts worldwide, focusing on political, military and humanitarian trends in current conflicts, whether they are local rebellions, long-term insurgencies, civil wars or inter-state conflicts. In addition to the comprehensive historical background for each conflict, the weekly timelines and the monthly updates, the statistics, data and reports in the ACD date back to 1997.
- Armed Conflict Location & Event Data Project: The Armed Conflict data set covers events occurring in Africa from 1997 to present. This data set includes the event date, longitude, latitude, and fatality magnitude scale.
- Militarized Interstate Disputes The Militarized Interstate Disputes (MID) data set "provides information about conflicts in which one or more states threaten, display, or use force against one or more other states between 1816 and 2010."
- Political Instability Task Force (PITF) State Failure Problem Set, 1955–2013: The Political Instability Task Force (PITF), State Failure Problem Set is part of a larger armed conflict database produced by the Center for Systemic Peace from open source data. Data in PITF are available on various subsets: ethnic war, revolutionary war, adverse regime change, and genocide or politicide.
- Rand Database of Worldwide Terrorism Incidents: The Rand Database of Worldwide Terrorism Incidents data set covers terrorism incidents worldwide from 1968 through 2009 but is not currently active. The data set includes a date, location (city, country), perpetrator, detailed description, and number of injuries and fatalities.
- Major Episodes of Political Violence: The Major Episodes of Political Violence data set is part of a larger armed conflict database produced by the Center for Systemic Peace. Political Violence data include annual, cross-national, time-series data on interstate, societal, and communal warfare magnitude scores (independence, interstate, ethnic, and civil; violence and warfare) for all countries.

=== Natural disasters ===
- Advanced National Seismic System (ANSS) Comprehensive Earthquake Catalog (ComCat): The ANSS Comprehensive Catalog (ComCat) contains earthquake source parameters (e.g. hypocenters, magnitudes, phase picks and amplitudes) and other products (e.g. moment tensor solutions, macroseismic information, tectonic summaries, maps) produced by contributing seismic networks.
- Dartmouth Flood Observatory: Dartmouth Flood Observatory uses "Space-based Measurement and Modeling of Surface Water" to track floods and uses news reporting to validate the results. This data set includes the country, start date, end date, affected square km, and cause of the flood. Additionally, this data set includes many magnitude scales, such as: dead, displaced, severity, damage, and flood magnitude.
- U.S. National Flood Insurance Program: The U.S. National Flood Insurance Program data set contains a data table detailing flooding events with 1,500 or more paid losses from 1978 to the current month and year. The table includes the name and year of the event, the number of paid losses, the total amount paid and the average payment per loss.
- FAOSTAT (Famine): The FAOSTAT data set was developed by the Statistics Division of the Food and Agricultural Organization of the United Nations (FAO). It is an active, global data set that covers famine events from 1990–2013.
- Global Volcanism Program: "Volcanoes of the World is a database describing the physical characteristics of volcanoes and their eruptions." The data contain a start date, end date, volcano name (which can be used to look up the location) and VEI magnitude scale.
- International Disaster Database: EM-DAT contains essential core data on the occurrence and effects of over 18,000 mass disasters in the world from 1900 to present. The database is compiled from various sources, including UN agencies, non-governmental organizations, insurance companies, research institutes and press agencies.
- NOAA Natural Hazards: The Natural Hazards dataset is part of the National Geophysical Data Center run by the U.S. National Oceanic and Atmospheric Administration (NOAA). The National Geophysical Data Center archives and assimilates tsunami, earthquake and volcano data to support research, planning, response and mitigation. Long-term data, including photographs, can be used to establish the history of natural hazard occurrences and help mitigate against future events.

=== Diseases ===
- FluView: FluView is produced by the U.S. Centers for Disease Control (CDC) and provides weekly influenza surveillance information in the United States by census area and includes the number of people tested and number of positive cases.
- Global Health Atlas: The Global Health Atlas contains data on four communicable diseases: cholera, influenza, polio, and yellow fever. It is an active, global data set that covers number of cases and fatalities due to these infectious diseases.

=== Others ===
- Aviation Safety Database: The Aviation Safety Database covers aviation safety incidents around the world. Every incident reports the location of the incident, the departing and arriving airports, number of fatalities and type of Airplane involved in the incident.
- Database of Radiological Incidents and Related Events: The Database of Radiological Incidents and Related Events covers events that resulted in acute radiation exposures to humans sufficient to cause casualties. The database includes the date, location, number of deaths, number of injuries and highest radiation dose recorded.

== See also ==
- 68–95–99.7 rule
- Black swan theory
- Extreme value theory
- Global catastrophic risks
- Rare disasters
- Rare event sampling
