= David K. Backus =

American economist

- Born: April 1953
- Died: June 12, 2016 (aged 63); New York City, New York, U.S.

Academic background
- Education: Yale University; Hamilton College

Academic work
- Discipline: Macroeconomics; Finance
- Institutions: New York University Stern School of Business
- Website: Information at IDEAS / RePEc

David King "Dave" Backus (April 1953 – June 12, 2016) was an American economist, specializing in financial economics and international macroeconomics. He was the Heinz Riehl Professor at New York University's Stern School of Business.

Backus made several significant contributions to macroeconomics and finance, including the canonical international business cycle model with Patrick J. Kehoe and Finn Kydland, and identifying the Backus–Smith puzzle (consumption and real-exchange-rates) and the Backus–Kehoe–Kydland puzzle (international consumption correlation).

Prior to joining the Stern School in 1990, he studied at Hamilton College (BA, 1975) and Yale University (PhD, 1981), taught at Queen's University and the University of British Columbia, and served at the Federal Reserve Bank of Minneapolis.

He died from leukemia in New York City on June 12, 2016.
