= Guido Baltussen =

Dutch Professor of Finance

- Born: July 2, 1981 (age 45)
- Occupation: Professor in Behavioral Finance

Academic work
- Discipline: Behavioral Finance
- Institutions: Erasmus University Rotterdam

Guido Baltussen (born 2 July 1981) is a Dutch economist who is professor in Behavioral Finance at Erasmus University Rotterdam and Head of Factor Investing and co-head of Quant Fixed Income at Robeco Asset Management.

== Education ==
Guido developed an early interest in finance and economics, which led him to pursue a career in the field. Baltussen completed his master studies (cum laude) and PhD in Financial Economics at Erasmus University Rotterdam. He is a research fellow at Tinbergen, ERIM and was visiting scholar at Stern School of Business of New York University. Besides working at Robeco he is currently professor in finance at the Erasmus University Rotterdam with as expertise Behavioral Finance and Investing.

== Career ==
Baltussen, is currently responsible for Robeco's factor equity and quant fixed income strategies, has had an extensive career in the financial industry as well as in academia.

He began his career in the investment industry in 2004 and was head of quantitative research fixed Income and multi asset at NN Investment Partners prior to rejoining Robeco in 2017. He has made significant contributions to the field of finance by authoring many articles and papers in leading economic and finance journals including the American Economic Review, Journal of Financial Economics, and Management Science. He has cooperated with 2017 Nobel laureate Richard Thaler and his research related to behavioral finance and factor investing and has been cited by fellow researchers. His research is covered in various media such as the Wall Street Journal, USA Today, Financial Times, Bloomberg News, and MoneyWeek.

== Selected publications ==
Guido has written many academic papers, with significant contributions to decision making theory factor investing. His co-authors include David Blitz, Haim Levy, Richard Thaler, Pim van Vliet, Peter Wakker, and others. His papers have been downloaded 80,000+ times on the Social Science Research Network (SSRN), a global top-500 author. As of 2023 his h-index is 10 (Scopus) and 15 (Scholar). Some of his notable publications are:

- Global Factor Premiums, with Laurens Swinkels and Pim van Vliet, Journal of Financial Economics, 2021.
- When Equity Factors Drop Their Shorts, with David Blitz and Pim van Vliet, Financial Analyst Journal, 2020.
- Irrational Diversification: An Examination of Individual Portfolio Choice, with Thierry Post, Journal of Quantitative and Financial Analysis, 2011.
- Unknown Unknowns: Uncertainty About Risk and Stock Returns, with Sjoerd van Bekkum and Bart van der Grient, Journal of Quantitative and Financial Analysis, 2018.
- Deal or No Deal? Decision Making under Risk in a Large-Payoff Game Show, with Thierry Post, Martijn van den Assem, and Richard Thaler, American Economic Review, 2008.

== See also ==
- Behavioral Economics
- Deal or No Deal
- Factor investing
