= Pim van Vliet =

Dutch fund manager

- Born: September 30, 1977 (age 49); Bodegraven, Netherlands
- Education: Erasmus University Rotterdam
- Occupations: Fund manager and author
- Known for: Quantitative Investing
- Notable work: Co-authored "High Returns From Low Risk"

Pim van Vliet (born 30 September 1977) is a Dutch fund manager specializing in quantitative investment strategies, with a focus on low-volatility equities. As the head of conservative equities at Robeco Quantitative Investments, van Vliet has contributed to the field through both academic research and practical investment management.

== Early life and education ==
Pim van Vliet holds a PhD in finance and a Master's in Economics (cum laude) from Erasmus University Rotterdam. He has a history degree and completed a dissertation on Downside Risk and Empirical Asset Pricing in 2004.

== Career ==
Van Vliet joined Robeco in 2005 as a quantitative fund analyst. In 2006, he initiated Robeco's Conservative Equity strategies, part of a broader shift within the finance industry towards data-driven, quantitative investing. He has published research in leading academic journals on topics such as low-volatility investing, factor premiums, and skewness preferences, and he has also contributed articles to the CFA Institute Blog.

His expertise has led to appearances on investment podcasts and webinars. and he has been cited in financial media including, the Financial Times, Reuters, Institutional Investor, Bloomberg, and the Washington Post. His work on the volatility effect received Emerald's Citation of Excellence Award.

== Selected publications ==
Van Vliet has written numerous of academic papers on quantitative investing. His papers, co-authored with researchers including David Blitz, Guido Baltussen, Eric Falkenstein, and Haim Levy, have been downloaded more than 100,000 times on SSRN. Notable publications include:

- Global Factor Premiums, with Guido Baltussen and Laurens Swinkels, Journal of Financial Economics, 2021.
- When Equity Factors Drop Their Shorts, with David Blitz and Guido Baltussen, Financial Analyst Journal, 2020.
- The Conservative Formula: Quantitative Investing Made Easy, with David Blitz, Journal of Portfolio Management, 2018.
- The Volatility Effect: Lower Risk without Lower Returns, with David Blitz, Journal of Portfolio Management, 2007.
- Risk Aversion and Skewness Preference, with Haim Levy and Thierry Post, Journal of Banking and Finance, 2008.

== Investment book ==
In 2016 Van Vliet co-authored High Returns from Low Risk: A Remarkable Stock Market Paradox with Jan de Koning. The book introduces defensive equity investing to a broad audience and presents the "Conservative Formula," which suggests that portfolios of lower-risk stocks can achieve higher returns than commonly assumed. It has been translated into several languages, including Chinese, German, French, Spanish, and Dutch.

== Personal life ==
Van Vliet lives in Berkel en Rodenrijs, the Netherlands. Van Vliet's early introduction to investing by his father has been a foundational influence on his career, a narrative he shares in his book to illustrate the long-term value of defensive investment strategies.

== See also ==
- Quantitative investing
- Low-volatility investing
- Value investing
- Momentum investing
