= Lucas paradox =

Economic observation that capital does not flow from rich to poor countries

In economics, the Lucas paradox or the Lucas puzzle is the observation that capital does not flow from developed countries to developing countries despite the fact that developing countries have lower levels of capital per worker.

Classical economic theory predicts that capital should flow from rich countries to poor countries, due to the effect of diminishing returns of capital. Poor countries have lower levels of capital per worker – which explains, in part, why they are poor. In poor countries, the scarcity of capital relative to labor should mean that the returns related to the infusion of capital are higher than in developed countries. In response, savers in rich countries should look at poor countries as profitable places in which to invest. In reality, things do not seem to work that way. Surprisingly little capital flows from rich countries to poor countries. This puzzle, famously discussed in a paper by Robert Lucas in 1990, is often referred to as the "Lucas Paradox".

The theoretical explanations for the Lucas Paradox can be grouped into two categories.

1. The first group attributes the limited amount of capital received by poorer nations to differences in fundamentals that affect the production structure of the economy, such as technological differences, missing factors of production, government policies, and the institutional structure.
2. The second group of explanations focuses on international capital market imperfections, mainly sovereign risk (risk of nationalization) and asymmetric information. Although the expected return on investment might be high in many developing countries, it does not flow there because of the high level of uncertainty associated with those expected returns.

== Example: development of Third World nations ==
Lucas' seminal paper was a reaction to observed trends in international development efforts during the 20th century. Regions characterized by poverty, such as South Asia and Africa, have received particular attention with regard to the underinvestment predicted by Lucas. African nations, with their impoverished populace and rich natural resources, has been upheld as exemplifying the type of nations that would, under neoclassical assumptions, be able to offer extremely high returns to capital. The meager foreign capital African nations receive outside of the charity of multinational corporations reveals the extent to which Lucas captured the realities of today's global capital flows.

Authors more recently have focused their explanations for the paradox on Lucas' first category of explanation, the difference in fundamentals of the production structure. Some have pointed to the quality of institutions as the key determinant of capital inflows to poorer nations. As evidence for the central role played by institutional stability, it has been shown that the amount of foreign direct investment a country receives is highly correlated to the strength of infrastructure and the stability of government in that country.

In many cases in Armenia, the Lucas paradox is confirmed․ Ineffective implementation of legal and legislative mechanisms, insufficient level of development of the financial sector, and ineffective allocation of high-quality human capital are possible reasons behind the low inflow of capital to Armenia.

== Counterexample: American economic development ==
Although Lucas' original hypothesis has widely been accepted as descriptive of the modern period in history, the paradox does not emerge as clearly before the 20th century. The colonial era, for instance, stands out as an age of unimpeded capital flows. The system of imperialism produced economic conditions particularly amenable to the movement of capital according to the assumptions of classical economics. Britain, for instance, was able to design, impose, and control the quality of institutions in its colonies to capitalize on the high returns to capital in the new world.

Jeffrey Williamson has explored in depth this reversal of the Lucas Paradox in the colonial context. Although not emphasized by Lucas himself, Williamson maintains that unimpeded labor migration is one way that capital flows to the citizens of developing nations. The empire structure was particularly important for facilitating low-cost international migration, allowing wage rates to converge across the regions in the British Empire. For instance, in the 17th and 18th century, England incentivized its citizens to move to the labor-scarce Americas, endorsing a system of indentured servitude to make overseas migration affordable.

While Britain enabled free capital flow from old to new world, the success of the American enterprise after the American Revolution is a good example of the role of institutional and legal frameworks for facilitating a continued flow of capital. The U.S. constitution's commitment to private property rights, rights of personal liberty; and strong contract law enabled investment from Britain to America to continue even without the incentives of the colonial relationship. In these ways, early American economic development, both pre and post-revolution, provides a case study for the conditions under which the Lucas Paradox is reversed. Even after the average income level in America exceeded that of Britain, the institutions exported under imperialism and the legal frameworks established after independence enabled long-term capital flows from Europe to America.

== See also ==
- Feldstein–Horioka puzzle
- Dependency theory
