= Robert Haugen =

American economist

- Born: June 26, 1942 (age 83); Chicago, Illinois, USA
- Died: January 6, 2013; Durango, Colorado
- Education: University of Illinois at Urbana-Champaign
- Occupations: Academic, Entrepreneur
- Spouse: Jan Bowler
- Children: Wendy Haugen, Sally Haugen Ellingsen

Robert (Bob) Arthur Haugen (June 26, 1942 – January 6, 2013) was a financial economist and a pioneer in the field of quantitative investing and low-volatility investing. He was President of Haugen Custom Financial Systems and also consulted and spoke globally.

== Career ==
While he has contributed research to the fields of insurance, real estate and equity investments, he is probably best known as a vocal critic of the efficient market hypothesis and the Capital Asset Pricing Model (CAPM). With his former professor, A. James Heins, he discovered in the late 60s and early 70s that, contrary to the prevailing theory, low risk stocks actually produce higher returns. The resulting article bestowed on him the unofficial designation of "father of low volatility investing". He was also the inventor of the Expected Return Factor Model. He was vocal concerning the evidence supporting market inefficiency and documented the low volatility anomaly and other quantitative factors such as value and momentum.

During the academic portion of his career he held endowed professorships at the University of Wisconsin, the University of Illinois, and the University of California, Irvine. Based on articles published in the top academic journals in financial economics, Haugen has been ranked as the 17th most prolific researcher in finance. The New Finance was required reading for the Chartered Financial Analyst (CFA) exam.

Haugen earned his B.S. and Ph.D. in finance from the University of Illinois Urbana-Champaign.

== Selected publications ==
His work can be found at Research gate. Here is a selection of his journal articles and books:

- On the Evidence Supporting the Existence of Risk Premiums in the Capital Market, Wisconsin working Paper Dec. 1972.
- Risk and the Rate of Return on Financial Assets: Some Old Wine in New Bottles, Journal of Financial and Quantitative Analysis, 1975.
- Resolving the Agency Problems of External Capital Through Options, The Journal of Finance, 1981.
- Agency Problems and Financial Contracting, Prentice Hall, 1985.
- Modern Investment Theory, Prentice Hall, 1986, revised 1990, 1993, 1996, 2001.
- The Role of Options in the Resolutions of Agency Problems: A Reply, The Journal of Finance, 1986.
- The Incredible January Effect, Dow Jones-Irwin, 1987.
- The Effect of Volatility Changes on the Level of Stock Prices and Expected Future Returns, The Journal of Finance, 1991.
- The New Finance: The Case Against Efficient Markets, Prentice Hall, 1995 (1st Edition), 1999 (2nd Edition)
- The New Finance: Overreaction, Complexity and Uniqueness, 2003 (3rd Edition), 2012 (4th Edition),
- Commonality of the Determinants of Expected Stock Returns, Journal of Financial Economics, 1996.
- Beast on Wall Street, Prentice Hall, 1998.
- The Inefficient Stock Market—What Pays Off and Why, Prentice Hall, 1999.
- Low Risk Stocks Outperform within All Observable Markets of the World, SSRN working paper 2012.
