= Martin Feldstein =

American economist (1939–2019)

- White House (1984), by Michael Evans

Chair of the Council of Economic Advisers
- In office October 14, 1982 – July 10, 1984
- President: Ronald Reagan
- Preceded by: Murray Weidenbaum
- Succeeded by: Beryl Sprinkel

Personal details
- Born: Martin Stuart Feldstein; November 25, 1939 New York City, U.S.
- Died: June 11, 2019 (aged 79) Boston, Massachusetts, U.S.
- Party: Republican
- Education: Harvard University (BA); Nuffield College, Oxford (BLitt, DPhil)

Academic background
- Doctoral advisor: W. M. Gorman

Academic work
- Discipline: Macroeconomics, public economics
- School or tradition: Neoclassical economics
- Institutions: Harvard University (1967–2019); National Bureau of Economic Research (1977–1982, 1984–2019)
- Doctoral students: Harvey S. Rosen; Eli Noam; Larry Summers; Jeffrey Sachs; Joel Slemrod; Douglas Elmendorf; Jeffrey Liebman Raj Chetty; Stephen Miran
- Notable ideas: Feldstein-Horioka puzzle
- Awards: John Bates Clark Medal (1977)
- Website: Information at IDEAS / RePEc

Martin Stuart Feldstein (/ˈfɛldstaɪn/ FELD-styne; November 25, 1939 – June 11, 2019) was an American economist. He was the George F. Baker Professor of Economics at Harvard University and the president emeritus of the National Bureau of Economic Research. He served as president and chief executive officer of the bureau from 1978 to 2008 (with the exception of 1982 to 1984). From 1982 to 1984, Feldstein served as chairman of the Council of Economic Advisers and as chief economic advisor to President Ronald Reagan (where his deficit hawk views clashed with the Reagan administration's large military expenditure policies). Feldstein was also a member of the Washington-based financial advisory body the Group of Thirty from 2003.

== Early life and education ==
Feldstein was born in New York City to a Jewish family and graduated from South Side High School in Rockville Centre, New York. He completed his undergraduate education at Harvard University (BA, summa cum laude, 1961), where he was affiliated with Adams House, and then attended Nuffield College, Oxford (B.Litt., 1963, which was promoted by tradition to an honorary M.A. in 1963; D.Phil., 1967). He was a Research Fellow there from 1964 to 1965, an Official Fellow from 1965 to 1967, and was later an Honorary Fellow of the college.

== Career ==
In 1977, he received the John Bates Clark Medal of the American Economic Association, a prize which was awarded every two years until 2010 when it began to be awarded yearly. It is awarded to the economist under the age of 40 who is judged to have made the greatest contribution to economic science. That same year, he was elected to the American Academy of Arts and Sciences. In 1989, he was elected to the American Philosophical Society. He was among the ten most influential economists in the world, according to IDEAS/RePEc. He was the author of more than 300 research articles in economics and made contributions to health economics, international economics, and the economics of national security. However, he was known primarily for his greater contributions to macroeconomics, public finance and social insurance. Pioneering much of the research on the working mechanism and sustainability of public pension systems, he advanced the current understanding of the effects of social insurance. Feldstein was an avid advocate of Social Security reform and was a main driving force behind former president George W. Bush's initiative of partial privatization of the Social Security system. Aside from his contributions to the field of public sector economics, he also authored other important macroeconomics papers. One of his more well-known papers in this field was his investigation with Charles Horioka of investment behavior in various countries. He and Horioka found that in the long run, capital tends to stay in its home country — that is to say, a nation's savings is used to fund its investment opportunities. This has since been known as the "Feldstein–Horioka puzzle."

In 1997, writing about the upcoming European monetary union and the euro, Feldstein warned that the "adverse economic effects of a single currency on unemployment and inflation would outweigh any gains from facilitating trade and capital flows" and that, while "conceived of as a way of reducing the risk of another intra-European war", it was "more likely to have the opposite effect" and "lead to increased conflicts within Europe and between Europe and the United States."

In 2003, Feldstein was awarded the Daniel M. Holland Medal in recognition of his contributions to taxation and public finance.

In 2005, Feldstein was widely considered a leading candidate to succeed chairman Alan Greenspan as Chairman of the Federal Reserve Board. This was in part due to his prominence in the Reagan administration and his position as an economic advisor for the Bush presidential campaign. The New York Times wrote an editorial advocating that Bush choose either Feldstein or Ben Bernanke due to their credentials, and the week of the nomination The Economist predicted that the two men had the greatest probability of selection out of the field of candidates. Ultimately, the position went to Bernanke, possibly because Feldstein was a board member of AIG, which announced the same year that it would restate five years of past financial reports by $2.7 billion. Subsequently, AIG suffered a serious financial collapse that played a central role in the worldwide economic crisis of 2007–2008 and the ensuing global recession. The firm was rescued only by multiple capital infusions by the U.S. Federal Reserve Bank, which extended a $182.5 billion line of credit. Although Feldstein was not explicitly linked to the accounting practices in question, he had served as a Director of AIG since 1988. In March 2007, the Lynde and Harry Bradley Foundation announced that one of four 2007 Bradley Prizes to honor outstanding achievement would be awarded to Feldstein. On September 10, 2007, Feldstein announced his resignation as president of the National Bureau of Economic Research effective June 2008.

Feldstein served as a member of the President's Foreign Intelligence Advisory Board from 2006 to 2009.

Feldstein said in March 2008 he believed the United States was in a recession and it could be a severe one.

As a member of the board of AIG Financial Products, Feldstein was one of those who had oversight of the division of the international insurer that contributed to the company's crisis in September 2008. In May 2009, Feldstein announced he would step down as a director of AIG. He served as a board member for Eli Lilly and Company. He also previously served on the boards of several other public companies including JPMorgan and TRW.

On February 6, 2009, Feldstein was announced as one of U.S. president Obama's advisors on the President's Economic Recovery Advisory Board. He served as a member on the President's Economic Recovery Advisory Board from 2009 to 2011.

=== Latter positions ===
He was a consultant to the U.S. Department of Defense.

He served on the board of directors of the Council on Foreign Relations, the Trilateral Commission, the Group of 30 and the National Committee on United States-China Relations. Feldstein was invited to participate in the Bilderberg Group annual conferences in 1996, 1998, 1999, 2001, 2002, 2003, 2005–2008 and 2010 through 2015. He was also a member of the JP Morgan Chase International Council, a member of the Academic Advisory Council of the American Enterprise Institute, and a member of the British Academy.

In 2011 he was included in the 50 Most Influential People in Global Finance ranking of Bloomberg Markets Magazine.

In 2017, Feldstein joined a small group of "Republican elder statesmen" proposing that conservatives embrace carbon taxes, with all revenue rebated with lump-sum dividends, as a policy to deal with global climate change. The group also included James A. Baker III, N. Gregory Mankiw, Henry M. Paulson Jr., and George P. Shultz.

== Significant interests and publications ==
=== "Domestic Saving and International Capital Flows" ===
"Domestic Saving and International Capital Flows" (1980) made a significant contribution to international economics. Feldstein along with Charles Horioka contributed to the overall understanding of the international capital market by revealing the essence of the flow of capital in the world capital market. By examining the relationship between domestic investment and domestic savings of 21 OECD countries, Feldstein and Horioka provide statistical estimates revealing that almost all incremental savings of a country will remain in that country despite greater investment opportunities abroad. Puzzled by the unexpected direct relationship between domestic savings and investment, Feldstein and Horioka's findings have become known as the "Feldstein-Horioka Puzzle".

=== "Social Security, Induced Retirement, and Aggregate Capital Accumulation" ===
"Social Security, Induced Retirement, and Aggregate Capital Accumulation" (1974) made a significant contribution to social insurance. Feldstein facilitated a greater understanding of the effects of social security upon household consumption and savings. The article provides a theoretical analysis of the impact of social security on an individual's decision regarding retirement and the amount of savings necessary for such retirement. Feldstein claimed that Social Security results in individuals deciding to save less for retirement and to retire earlier.

Eight years after Feldstein's study, Dean Leimer and Selig Lesnoy of the U.S. Social Security Administration attempted to replicate his results and uncovered programming mistakes in Feldstein's analysis that invalidated his earlier results, which Feldstein acknowledged and issued a retraction. They also found what they deemed unreasonable assumptions in the construction of the social security wealth variable. After correcting these issues, Leimer and Lesnoy found a much weaker relationship between Social Security and personal savings than Feldstein had originally suggested. In fact, their results indicated that Social Security may have contributed to increased savings.

=== European Union, euro and sovereign debt crisis ===
Feldstein participated in the academic and popular debate on the European Union (EU) and the European common currency from its early stages, with increased interest during the sovereign debt crisis. Taking a political economy perspective, Feldstein argued that the European Union project in general and the creation of the Economic and Monetary Union (EMU) in particular were driven by a strange mix of pro-European internationalism and the pursuit of strictly national interests. Although nuanced in his criticism, Feldstein can be characterized as a Eurosceptic. Feldstein, an enthusiastic supporter of a single market for goods and services in the EU, argued that this goal does not require a monetary union. Furthermore, the creation of a single currency in the EU would increase political tensions in the union, as not all countries share the anti-inflationary stance of the German policy makers. In military and foreign policy, the objective of achieving a political union (of which the monetary unification is only one aspect) would promote the development of a common foreign and defense policy capable of projecting strength on the international scene. During the sovereign debt crisis, Feldstein argued in favor of a "eurozone holiday" solution whereby the countries most affected by the crisis (such as Greece) would temporarily leave the eurozone, revert to their national currencies, devalue and re-enter at a lower exchange rate a few years later, a policy that would ensure a boost in international competitiveness solid enough to offset the economic recession.

== Teaching ==
A well-known figure on the Harvard campus, Feldstein taught the introductory economics class "Social Analysis 10: Principles of Economics" for 20 years and was succeeded by N. Gregory Mankiw. The class, since renamed Economics 10, was usually the largest class at Harvard, which remains the case. He also taught courses in American economic policy and public sector economics at Harvard College.

Feldstein may have made one of his greatest impacts by the concentration of his students in top echelons of government and academia, such as Larry Summers, former Harvard president and U.S. Treasury secretary; David Ellwood, dean of Harvard Kennedy School; and James Poterba, MIT professor and member of Bush's tax reform advisory panel. Lawrence Lindsey, formerly Bush's top economic adviser, wrote his doctoral thesis under Feldstein, as did Harvey S. Rosen, the previous chairman of the president's Council of Economic Advisers, Douglas Elmendorf, the former Director of the Congressional Budget Office, José Piñera, Chile's Secretary of Labor and Social Security during its pension privatization in 1980–1981, Jeffrey Sachs, Director of the Earth Institute at Columbia University, and Glenn Hubbard, Bush's first chairman of the council and now dean of the Columbia Business School.

Political offices
Preceded by Murray Weidenbaum	Chair of the Council of Economic Advisers; 1989–1993	Succeeded by Beryl Sprinkel
Academic offices
Preceded by Peter Diamond	President of the American Economic Association; 2004–2005	Succeeded by Daniel McFadden
