= Linda Tesar =

American economist

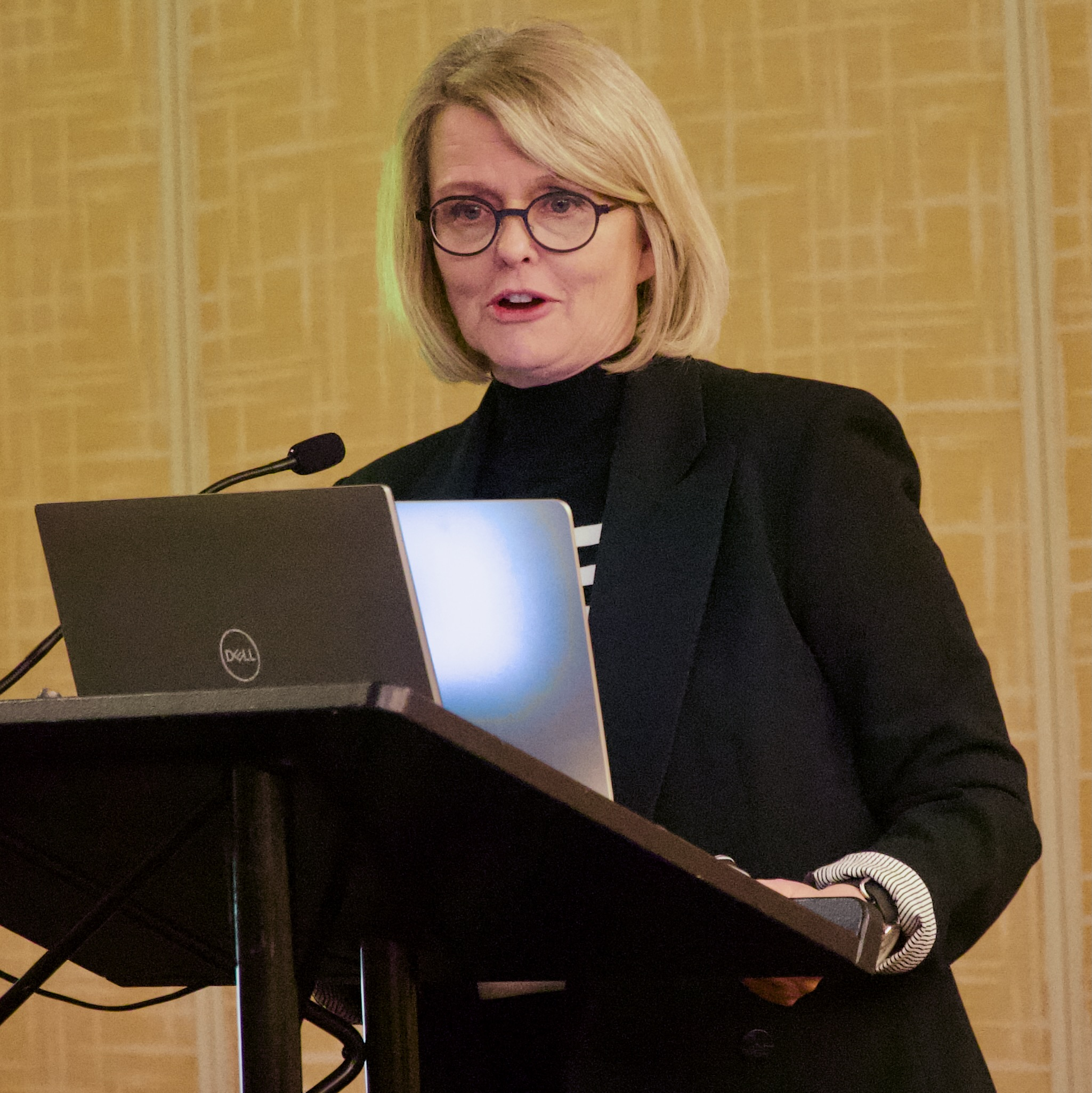
- Tesar in 2025
- Born: c. 1961 (age 64–65)
- Education: University of Minnesota; B.A. of International Relations; B.S. of Economics; University of Rochester; M.A. & Ph.D. in Economics
- Known for: International Finance; International Trade; Macroeconomics
- Website: https://lsa.umich.edu/econ/people/faculty/ltesar.html

Linda L. Tesar (born c. 1961) is a professor of economics at the University of Michigan College of Literature, Science, and the Arts (LSA), the liberal arts and sciences school of the University of Michigan in Ann Arbor. She is also a research associate at the National Bureau of Economic Research and the Editor-in-Chief of the IMF Economic Review. She has been a visitor in the Research Departments of the International Monetary Fund, the Federal Reserve Board of Governors and the Federal Reserve Bank of Minneapolis. In the past, she has also served on the academic advisory council to the Federal Reserve Bank of Chicago. From 2014 to 2015, Tesar served as Senior Economist on the Council of Economic Advisers.

Her field of specialization is in international finance, international trade and macroeconomics, with significant research in the international transmission of business cycles and fiscal policy, the benefits of global risk-sharing, capital flows to emerging markets, the impact of exchange rate exposure, international tax competition and the challenges facing the euro area. Her research has been published in the American Economic Review, the Journal of International Economics, the Review of Financial Studies and the Journal of Monetary Economics.

Tesar is actively engaged in efforts to improve the climate for women and underrepresented minorities in the economics discipline. She is a long-time member of the American Economic Association's Committee and has mentored junior faculty at various universities. She has also served on the board of the University of Michigan's Advance program, with the objective of improving institutional climate and supporting good practice in faculty recruitment, retention, and leadership. She participates in the national Women in Macroeconomics initiative and is a regularly invited speaker on gender issues in economics.

== Education and work ==
Tesar earned her B.A. of International Relations and B.S. of economics in 1984 from the University of Minnesota, both of which she graduated with honours. After completing her undergraduate education, she worked as a research assistant for one year at the Brookings Institution. She continued her education at the University of Rochester, where she received her M.A and Ph.D. in economics in 1988 and 1990 respectively. She joined the faculty at the University of California, Santa Barbara for 7 years before she became a professor in the Department of Economics at the University of Michigan in 1997, where she served as department chair from 2007 to 2011. She is currently director of the doctoral program at Michigan, as well as the head of admissions.

== Selected scholarship ==
=== The Collapse of International Trade During the 2008-2009 Crisis: In Search of the Smoking Gun (2010) ===
Together with Andrei A. Levchenko and Logan T. Lewis, Tesar explores the collapse in international trade during the most recent global recession. They analyse disaggregated data on U.S. imports and exports to shed light on the anatomy of the collapse. They find that the recent reduction in trade relative to overall economic activity is far larger than in previous downturns. During the examination of data, a 40% shortfall is revealed in quantities and prices of both domestic absorption and imports, relative to what would be predicted by a simple import demand relationship. They find that sectors used as intermediate inputs experienced significantly higher percentage reductions in both imports and exports while exploring a sample of imports and exports disaggregated at the 6-digit NAICS level. They also find support for compositional effects: sectors with larger reductions in domestic output had larger drops in trade. In contrast to the climate of opinion, they did not find support for the hypothesis that trade credit played a role in the recent trade collapse.

=== The Value of Control in Emerging Markets (2010) ===
This paper studies the economically large and statistically significant increase in acquiring firm's stock price when a developed country multinational firm acquires majority control of a firm in an emerging market. Along with Anusha Chari and Paige P. Ouimet, Tesar explores two decades (1986–2006) in which developed-market acquirers experienced positive and significant abnormal returns of 1.16%, on average, over a three-day event window. it is revealed that these positive acquirer returns and dollar value gains are unique to emerging-market mergers, and the gains are not replicated when the same acquirers take over firms in developed markets. The stock price increase is significantly more in two scenarios: the weaker the contracting environment in the emerging market and for industries with high asset intangibility.

=== Border Effect or Country Effect? Seattle May Not Be So Far from Vancouver After All (2009) ===
"Border effect refers to asymmetries in trade patterns between cities and regions of different countries that share a national border and those that are located in the same country. Usually, trade volume is much lesser between the former cities and regions." Yuriy Gorodnichenko and Tesar re-examines the evidence on the border effect in this paper. They argue that if there is cross-country heterogeneity in the distribution of price differentials within a country, then there is no clear reference point from which to set a standard for the effect of the border. Due to the lack of a structural model or natural experiment, it is not possible to separate the "border" effect from the effect of trading with a country with different distribution of prices. This paper aims to prove that the "border effect" identified by Engel and Rogers (1996) is driven entirely by the difference in the distribution of prices in United States and Canada.

=== Trade, Production Sharing, and the International Transmission of Business Cycles (2008) ===
Ariel Burstein, Christopher Kurz and Tesar conclude in this paper that countries that are more engaged in production sharing exhibit higher bilateral manufacturing output correlations. They analyze data on trade flows between US multinationals and their affiliates, as well as trade between the United States and Mexican maquiladoras to measure production-sharing trade and its connection with the business cycle. They develop a quantitative model of international business cycles that generates a positive link between the extent of vertically integrated production-sharing trade and internationally synchronized business cycles. A key assumption that is made in the creation of the model is a relatively low elasticity of substitution between home and foreign inputs in the production of a vertically integrated good.

== Publications ==
=== Working papers ===
- Christopher L. House, Christian Proebsting, Linda L. Tesar (2019) Regional Effects of Exchange Rate Fluctuations. NBER Working Paper No. 26071
- Christopher L. House, Christian Proebsting, Linda L. Tesar (2018) Quantifying the Benefits of Labor Mobility in a Currency Union. NBER Working Paper No. 25347
- Ron Alquist, Nicolas Berman, Rahul Mukherjee, Linda Tesar (2018) Financial Constraints, Institutions, and Foreign Ownership. NBER Working Paper No. 24241
- Christopher L. House, Christian Proebsting, Linda L. Tesar (2017) Austerity in the Aftermath of the Great Recession. NBER Working Paper No. 23147
- Christopher L. House, Linda L. Tesar (2015) Greek Budget Realities: No Easy Options. NBER Working Paper No. 21688
- Enrique G. Mendoza, Linda L. Tesar, Jing Zhang (2014) Saving Europe?: The Unpleasant Arithmetic of Fiscal Austerity in Integrated Economies. NBER Working Paper No. 20200
- Ron Alquist, Rahul Mukherjee, Linda Tesar (2013) Fire-sale FDI or Business as Usual? NBER Working Paper No. 18837
- Yun Jung Kim, Linda Tesar, Jing Zhang (2012) The Impact of Foreign Liabilities on Small Firms: Firm-Level Evidence from the Korean Crisis. NBER Working Paper No. 17756
- Andrei Levchenko, Logan Lewis, Linda L. Tesar (2010) The Role of Financial Factors in the Trade Collapse: A Skeptic's View. Working Papers from Research Seminar in International Economics No 616
- Ariel Burstein, Christopher Kurz, Linda L. Tesar (2008) Trade, Production Sharing, and the International Transmission of Business Cycles. NBER Working Paper No.13731
- Yuriy Gorodnichenko, Linda L. Tesar (2005) A Re-Examination of the Border Effect. NBER Working Paper No.11706
- Sebastian Auguste, Kathryn Dominguez, Herman Kamil, Linda L. Tesar (2005) Cross-Border Trading as a Mechanism for Implicit Capital Flight: ADRs and the Argentine Crisis. Working Papers from Research Seminar in International Economics No 533
- Kathryn Dominguez, Linda L. Tesar (2005) International Borrowing and Macroeconomic Performance in Argentina. NBER Working Paper No.11353
- Anusha Chari, Paige P. Ouimet, Linda L. Tesar (2004) Acquiring Control in Emerging Markets: Evidence from the Stock Market. NBER Working Paper No.10872
- Anusha Chari, Paige P. Ouimet, Linda L. Tesar (2004) Enhancing the Benefits for India and Other Developing Countries in the Doha Development Agenda Negotiations. Working Papers from Research Seminar in International Economics No 511
- Enrique Mendoza, Linda L. Tesar (2004) Winners and Losers of Tax Competition in the European Union. Working Papers from Research Seminar in International Economics No 508
- Enrique Mendoza, Linda L. Tesar (2003) A Quantitative Analysis of Tax Competition v. Tax Coordination under Perfect Capital Mobility. NBER Working Paper No.9746
- Enrique G. Mendoza, Linda L. Tesar (1995) Supply-Side Economics in a Global Economy. NBER Working Paper No. 5086
- Enrique G. Mendoza, Assaf Razin, Linda L. Tesar (1994) Computing Effective Tax Rates on Factor Incomes and Consumption: An International Macroeconomic Perspective. CEPR Discussion Papers No. 866
- Enrique G. Mendoza, Assaf Razin, Linda L. Tesar (1994) Effective Tax Rates in Macroeconomics: Cross-Country Estimates of Tax Rates on Factor Incomes and Consumption. NBER Working Paper No. 4864
- Linda L. Tesar, Ingrid M. Werner (1994) International Equity Transactions and U.S. Portfolio Choice. NBER Working Paper No. 4611
- Linda L. Tesar, Ingrid M. Werner (1992) Home Bias and the High Turnover. NBER Working Paper No. 4218
- Alan C. Stockman, Linda L. Tesar (1990) Tastes and Technology in a Two-Country Model of the Business Cycle: Explaining International Comovements. NBER Working Paper No. 3566

=== Journal articles ===
- Yuriy Gorodnichenko, Enrique G. Mendoza, Linda L. Tesar (2012) The Finnish Great Depression: From Russia with Love. American Economic Review, vol. 102, issue 4, 1619–44
- Andrei Levchenko, Logan Lewis, Linda L. Tesar (2011) The "Collapse in Quality" Hypothesis. American Economic Review, vol. 101, issue 3, 293–97
- Andrei Levchenko, Logan Lewis, Linda L. Tesar (2010) The Collapse of International Trade during the 2008–09 Crisis: In Search of the Smoking Gun. IMF Economic Review, vol. 58, issue 2, 214–253
- Anusha Chari, Paige P. Ouimet, Linda L. Tesar (2010) The Value of Control in Emerging Markets. Review of Financial Studies, vol. 23, issue 4, 1741–1770
- Yuriy Gorodnichenko, Linda L. Tesar (2009) Border Effect or Country Effect? Seattle May Not Be So Far from Vancouver After All. American Economic Journal: Macroeconomics, vol. 1, issue 1, 219–41
- Ariel Burstein, Christopher Kurz, Linda L. Tesar (2008) Trade, Production Sharing, and the International Transmission of Business Cycles. Journal of Monetary Economics, vol. 55, issue 4, 775–795
- Sebastian Auguste, Kathryn Dominguez, Herman Kamil, Linda L. Tesar (2006) Cross-Border Trading as a Mechanism for Capital Flight: ADRs and the Argentine Crisis. Journal of Monetary Economics, vol. 53, issue 7, 1259–1295
- Kathryn Dominguez, Linda L. Tesar (2006) Exchange Rate Exposure. Journal of International Economics, vol. 68, issue 1, 188–218
- Enrique Mendoza, Linda L. Tesar (2005) Why hasn't tax competition triggered a race to the bottom? Some quantitative lessons from the EU. Journal of Monetary Economics, 2005, vol. 52, issue 1, 163–204
- Patrick F. Rowland and Linda L. Tesar (2004) Multinationals and the Gains from International Diversification. Review of Economic Dynamics, vol. 7, issue 4, 789–826
- Kathryn Dominguez, Linda L. Tesar (2001) A Re-Examination of Exchange Rate Exposure. American Economic Review, vol. 91, issue 2, 396–399
- Kathryn Dominguez, Linda L. Tesar (2001) Trade and Exposure. American Economic Review, vol. 91, issue 2, 367–370
- Enrique G. Mendoza, Linda L. Tesar (1998) The International Ramifications of Tax Reforms: Supply-Side Economics in a Global Economy. American Economic Review, vol. 88, issue 1, 226–45
- Henning Bohn, Linda L. Tesar (1996) U.S. Equity Investment in Foreign Markets: Portfolio Rebalancing or Return Chasing? American Economic Review, 1996, vol. 86, issue 2, 77–81
- Linda L. Tesar (1995) Evaluating the Gains from International Risksharing. Carnegie-Rochester Conference Series on Public Policy, vol. 42, issue 1, 95–143
- Linda L. Tesar, Ingrid M. Werner (1995) Home Bias and High Turnover. Journal of International Money and Finance, vol. 14, issue 4, 467–492
- Alan Stockman, Linda L. Tesar (1995) Tastes and Technology in a Two-Country Model of the Business Cycle: Explaining International Comovements. American Economic Review, vol. 85, issue 1, 168–85
- Linda L. Tesar, Ingrid M. Werner (1995) U.S. Equity Investment in Emerging Stock Markets. World Bank Economic Review, vol. 9, issue 1, 109–29
- Enrique Mendoza, Assaf Razin, Linda L. Tesar (1994) Effective Tax Rates in Macroeconomics: Cross-country Estimates of Tax Rates on Factor Incomes and Consumption. Journal of Monetary Economics, vol. 34, issue 3, 297–323
- Linda L. Tesar (1993) International Risk-sharing and Non-traded Goods. Journal of International Economics, vol. 35, issue 1–2, 69–89
- Linda L. Tesar (1991) Savings, Investment and International Capital Flows. Journal of International Economics, vol. 31, issue 1–2, 55–78

=== Chapters ===
- Linda L. Tesar (2008) Production Sharing and Business Cycle Synchronization in the Accession Countries. NBER International Seminar on Macroeconomics 2006, pp 195–238
- Kathryn Dominguez, Linda L. Tesar (2007) International Borrowing and Macroeconomic Performance in Argentina. Capital Controls and Capital Flows in Emerging Economies: Policies, Practices, and Consequences, pp 297–348
- Linda L. Tesar, Rene M. Stulz, Stephen Friedman, George N. Hatsopoulos (1999) The Role of Equity Markets in International Capital Flows. International Capital Flows, pp 235–306
- Linda L. Tesar, Ingrid M. Werner (1994) International Equity Transactions and U.S. Portfolio Choice. The Internationalization of Equity Markets, pp 185–227
