= Equity premium puzzle =

Economics concept

The equity premium puzzle refers to the inability of an important class of economic models to explain the average equity risk premium (ERP) provided by a diversified portfolio of equities over that of government bonds, which has been observed for more than 100 years. There is a significant disparity between returns produced by stocks compared to returns produced by government treasury bills. The equity premium puzzle addresses the difficulty in understanding and explaining this disparity. This disparity is calculated using the equity risk premium:

The equity risk premium is equal to the difference between equity returns and returns from government bonds. It is equal to around 5% to 8% in the United States.

The risk premium represents the compensation awarded to the equity holder for taking on a higher risk by investing in equities rather than government bonds. However, the 5% to 8% premium is considered to be an implausibly high difference and the equity premium puzzle refers to the unexplained reasons driving this disparity.

== Description ==
The term was coined by Rajnish Mehra and Edward C. Prescott in a study published in 1985 titled "The Equity Premium: A Puzzle". An earlier version of the paper was published in 1982 under the title "A test of the intertemporal asset pricing model". The authors found that a standard general equilibrium model, calibrated to display key U.S. business cycle fluctuations, generated an equity premium of less than 1% for reasonable risk aversion levels. This result stood in sharp contrast with the average equity premium of 6% observed during the historical period.

In 1982, Robert J. Shiller published the first calculation that showed that either a large risk aversion coefficient or counterfactually large consumption variability was required to explain the means and variances of asset returns. Azeredo (2014) shows, however, that increasing the risk aversion level may produce a negative equity premium in an Arrow-Debreu economy constructed to mimic the persistence in U.S. consumption growth observed in the data since 1929.

The intuitive notion that stocks are much riskier than bonds is not a sufficient explanation of the observation that the magnitude of the disparity between the two returns, the equity risk premium (ERP), is so great that it implies an implausibly high level of investor risk aversion that is fundamentally incompatible with other branches of economics, particularly macroeconomics and financial economics.

The process of calculating the equity risk premium, and selection of the data used, is highly subjective to the study in question, but is generally accepted to be in the range of 3–7% in the long-run. Dimson et al. calculated a premium of "around 3–3.5% on a geometric mean basis" for global equity markets during 1900–2005 (2006). However, over any one decade, the premium shows great variability—from over 19% in the 1950s to 0.3% in the 1970s.

In 1997, Siegel found that the actual standard deviation of the 20-year rate of return was only 2.76%. This means that for long-term investors, the risk of holding the stock of a smaller than expected can be derived only by looking at the standard deviation of annual earnings. For long-term investors, the actual risks of fixed-income securities are higher. Through a series of reasoning, the equity premium should be negative.

To quantify the level of risk aversion implied if these figures represented the expected outperformance of equities over bonds, investors would prefer a certain payoff of $51,300 to a 50/50 bet paying either $50,000 or $100,000.

The puzzle has led to an extensive research effort in both macroeconomics and finance. So far a range of useful theoretical tools and numerically plausible explanations have been presented, but no one solution is generally accepted by economists.

== Theory ==
The economy has a single representative household whose preferences over stochastic consumption paths are given by:

$$E_0 \left[\sum_{t=0}^\infty \beta^t U(c_t)\right]$$

where $0<\beta<1$ is the subjective discount factor, $c_t$ is the per capita consumption at time $t$, U() is an increasing and concave utility function. In the Mehra and Prescott (1985) economy, the utility function belongs to the constant relative risk aversion class:

$$U(c, \alpha) = \frac{c^{(1-\alpha)}}{1-\alpha}$$

where $0< \alpha < \infty$ is the constant relative risk aversion parameter. Note that $\lim_{\alpha \to 1 } U(c,\alpha) = \ln(c)$. Weil (1989) replaced the constant relative risk aversion utility function with the Kreps-Porteus nonexpected utility preferences.

$$U_t = \left[c_t^{1-\rho}+\beta (E_t U_{t+1}^{1-\alpha})^{(1-\rho)/(1-\alpha)}\right]^{1/(1-\rho)}$$

The Kreps-Porteus utility function has a constant intertemporal elasticity of substitution and a constant coefficient of relative risk aversion which are not required to be inversely related - a restriction imposed by the constant relative risk aversion utility function. Mehra and Prescott (1985) and Weil (1989) economies are a variations of Lucas (1978) pure exchange economy. In their economies the growth rate of the endowment process, $x_t$, follows an ergodic Markov Process.

$$P \left [x_{t+1} = \lambda_j | x_t = \lambda_i \right] = \phi_{i,j}$$

where $x_t \in \{\lambda_1,...,\lambda_n\}$. This assumption is the key difference between Mehra and Prescott's economy and Lucas' economy where the level of the endowment process follows a Markov Process.

There is a single firm producing the perishable consumption good. At any given time $t$, the firm's output must be less than or equal to $y_{t}$ which is stochastic and follows $y_{t+1}=x_{t+1} y_{t}$. There is only one equity share held by the representative household.

We work out the intertemporal choice problem. This leads to:

$$p_t U'(c_t) = \beta E_t[(p_{t+1} + y_{t+1}) U'(c_{t+1})]$$

as the fundamental equation.

For computing stock returns

$$1 = \beta E_t\left[\frac{U'(c_{t+1})}{U'(c_t)} R_{e, t+1}\right]$$

where

$$R_{e, t+1} = (p_{t+1} + y_{t+1}) / p_t$$

gives the result.

The derivative of the Lagrangian with respect to the percentage of stock held must equal zero to satisfy necessary conditions for optimality under the assumptions of no arbitrage and the law of one price.

== Data ==
Much data exists that says that stocks have higher returns. For example, Jeremy Siegel says that stocks in the United States have returned 6.8% per year over a 130-year period.

Proponents of the capital asset pricing model say that this is due to the higher beta of stocks, and that higher-beta stocks should return even more.

Others have criticized that the period used in Siegel's data is not typical, or the country is not typical.

== Possible explanations ==
A large number of explanations for the puzzle have been proposed. These include:

- Rare events hypothesis,
- Myopic loss aversion,
- rejection of the Arrow-Debreu model in favor of different models,
- modifications to the assumed preferences of investors,
- imperfections in the model of risk aversion,
- the excess premium for the risky assets equation results when assuming exceedingly low consumption/income ratios,
- and a contention that the equity premium does not exist: that the puzzle is a statistical illusion.

Kocherlakota (1996), Mehra and Prescott (2003) present a detailed analysis of these explanations in financial markets and conclude that the puzzle is real and remains unexplained. Subsequent reviews of the literature have similarly found no agreed resolution.

The mystery of stock premiums occupies a special place in financial and economic theories, and more progress is needed to understand the spread of stocks on bonds. Over time, as well as to determine the factors driving equity premium in various countries / regions may still be active research agenda.

A 2023 paper by Edward McQuarrie argues the equity risk premium may not exist, at least not as is commonly understood, and is furthermore based on data from a too narrow a time period in the late 20th century. He argues a more detailed examination of historical data finds "over multi-decade periods, sometimes stocks outperformed bonds, sometimes bonds outperformed stocks and sometimes they performed about the same. New international data confirm this pattern. Asset returns in the US in the 20th century do not generalize."

=== The equity premium: a deeper puzzle ===
Azeredo (2014) showed that traditional pre-1930 consumption measures understate the extent of serial correlation in the U.S. annual real growth rate of per capita consumption of non-durables and services ("consumption growth"). Under alternative measures proposed in the study, the serial correlation of consumption growth is found to be positive. This new evidence implies that an important subclass of dynamic general equilibrium models studied by Mehra and Prescott (1985) generates negative equity premium for reasonable risk-aversion levels, thus further exacerbating the equity premium puzzle.

=== Rare events hypothesis ===
One possible solution to the equity premium puzzle considered by Julliard and Ghosh (2008) is whether it can be explained by the rare events hypothesis, founded by Rietz (1988). They hypothesized that extreme economic events such as the Great Depression, the World Wars and the Great Financial Crisis resulted in equity holders demanding high equity premiums to account for the possibility of the significant loss they could suffer if these events were to materialise. As such, when these extreme economic events do not occur, equity holders are rewarded with higher returns. However, Julliard and Ghosh concluded that rare events are unlikely to explain the equity premium puzzle because the Consumption Capital Asset Pricing Model was rejected by their data and much greater risk aversion levels were required to explain the equity premium puzzle. Moreover, extreme economic events affect all assets (both equity and bonds) and they all yield low returns. For example, the equity premium persisted during the Great Depression, and this suggests that an even greater catastrophic economic event is required, and it must be one which only affect stocks, not bonds.

=== Myopic loss aversion ===
Benartzi & Thaler (1995) contend that the equity premium puzzle can be explained by myopic loss aversion and their explanation is based on Kahneman and Tversky's prospect theory. They rely on two assumptions about decision-making to support theory; loss aversion and mental accounting. Loss aversion refers to the assumption that investors are more sensitive to losses than gains, and in fact, research calculates utility of losses felt by investors to be twice that of the utility of a gain. The second assumption is that investors frequently evaluate their stocks even when the purpose of the investment is to fund retirement or other long-term goals. This makes investors more risk averse compared to if they were evaluating their stocks less frequently. Their study found that the difference between returns gained from stocks and returns gained from bonds decrease when stocks are evaluated less frequently. The two combined creates myopic loss aversion and Benartzi & Thaler concluded that the equity premium puzzle can be explained by this theory.

=== Individual characteristics ===
Some explanations rely on assumptions about individual behavior and preferences different from those made by Mehra and Prescott. Examples include the prospect theory model of Benartzi and Thaler (1995) based on loss aversion. A problem for this model is the lack of a general model of portfolio choice and asset valuation for prospect theory.

A second class of explanations is based on relaxation of the optimization assumptions of the standard model. The standard model represents consumers as continuously-optimizing dynamically-consistent expected-utility maximizers. These assumptions provide a tight link between attitudes to risk and attitudes to variations in intertemporal consumption which is crucial in deriving the equity premium puzzle. Solutions of this kind work by weakening the assumption of continuous optimization, for example by supposing that consumers adopt satisficing rules rather than optimizing. An example is info-gap decision theory, based on a non-probabilistic treatment of uncertainty, which leads to the adoption of a robust satisficing approach to asset allocation.

=== Equity characteristics ===
Another explanation of the equity premium puzzle focuses on the characteristics of equity that cannot be captured by typical models but are still consistent with optimisation by investors.

The most significant characteristic that is not typically considered is the requirement for equity holders to monitor their activity and have a manager to assist them. Therefore, the principal-agent relationship is very prevalent between corporation managers and equity holders. If an investor was to choose to not have a manager, it is likely costly for them to monitor the activity of the corporations that they invest in and often rely heavily on auditors or they look to the market hypothesis in which information about asset values in the equity markets are exposed. This hypothesis is based on the theory that an investor who is inexperienced and uninformed can bank on the fact that they will get average market returns in an identifiable market portfolio, which is questionable as to whether or not this can be done by an uninformed investor. Although, as per the characteristics of equity in explaining the premium, it is only necessary to hypothesise that people looking to invest do not think they can reach the same level of performance of the market.

Another explanation related to the characteristics of equity was explored by a variety of studies including Holmstrom and Tirole (1998), Bansal and Coleman (1996) and Palomino(1996)and was in relation to liquidity. Palomino described the noise trader model that was thin and had imperfect competition is the market for equities and the lower its equilibrium price dropped the higher the premium over risk-free bonds would rise. Holmstrom and Tirole in their studies developed another role for liquidity in the equity market that involved firms willing to pay a premium for bonds over private claims when they would be facing uncertainty over liquidity needs.

=== Tax distortions ===
Another explanation related to the observed growing equity premium was argued by McGrattan and Prescott (2001) to be a result of variations over time of taxes and particularly its effect on interest and dividend income. It is difficult however to give credibility to this analysis due to the difficulties in calibration utilised as well as ambiguity surrounding the existence of any noticeable equity premium before 1945. Even given this, it is evident that the observation that equity premium changes arising from the distortion of taxes over time should be taken into account and give more validity to the equity premium itself.

Related data is mentioned in the Handbook of the Equity Risk Premium. Beginning in 1919, it captured the post-World War I recovery, while omitting wartime losses and low pre-war returns. After adding these earlier years, the arithmetic average of the British stock premium for the entire 20th century is 6.6%, which is about 21/4% lower than the incorrect data inferred from 1919-1999.

=== Implied volatility ===
Graham and Harvey have estimated that, for the United States, the expected average premium during the period June 2000 to November 2006 ranged between 4.65 and 2.50. They found a modest correlation of 0.62 between the 10-year equity premium and a measure of implied volatility (in this case VIX, the Chicago Board Options Exchange Volatility Index).

Dennis, Mayhew & Stivers (2006) find that changes in implied volatility have an asymmetric effect on stock returns. They found that negative changes in implied volatility have a stronger impact on stock returns than positive changes in implied volatility. The authors argue that such an asymmetric volatility effect can be explained by the fact that investors are more concerned with downside risk than upside potential. That is, investors are more likely to react to negative news and expect negative changes in implied volatility to have a stronger impact on stock returns. The authors also find that changes in implied volatility can predict future stock returns. Stocks that experience negative changes in implied volatility have higher expected returns in the future. The authors state that this relationship is caused by the association between negative changes in implied volatility and market downturns.

Yan (2011) presents an explanation for the equity premium puzzle using the slope of the implied volatility smile. The implied volatility smile refers to the pattern of implied volatilities for options contracts with the same expiration date but different strike prices. The slope of the implied volatility smile reflects the market's expectations for future changes in the stock price, with a steeper slope indicating higher expected volatility. The author shows that the slope of the implied volatility smile is a significant predictor of stock returns, even after controlling for traditional risk factors. Specifically, stocks with steeper implied volatility smiles (i.e., higher jump risk) have higher expected returns, consistent with the equity premium puzzle. The author argues that this relationship between the slope of the implied volatility smile and stock returns can be explained by investors' preference for jump risk. Jump risk refers to the risk of sudden, large movements in the stock price, which are not fully captured by traditional measures of volatility. Yan argues that investors are willing to accept lower average returns on stocks that have higher jump risk, because they expect to be compensated with higher returns during times of market stress.

=== Information derivatives ===
The simplest scientific interpretation of the puzzle suggests that consumption optimization is not responsible for the equity premium. More precisely, the timeseries of aggregate consumption is not a leading explanatory factor of the equity premium.

The human brain is (simultaneously) engaged in many strategies. Each of these strategies has a goal. While individually rational, the strategies are in constant competition for limited resources. Even within a single person this competition produces a highly complex behavior which does not fit any simple model.

Nevertheless, the individual strategies can be understood. In finance this is equivalent to understanding different financial products as information derivatives i.e. as products which are derived from all the relevant information available to the customer. If the numerical values for the equity premium are unknown, the rational examination of the equity product would have accurately predicted the observed ballpark values.

From the information derivatives viewpoint consumption optimization is just one possible goal (which never really comes up in practice in its pure academic form). To a classically trained economist this may feel like a loss of a fundamental principle. But it may also be a much needed connection to reality (capturing the real behavior of live investors). Viewing equities as a stand-alone product (information derivative) does not isolate them from the wider economic picture. Equity investments survive in competition with other strategies. The popularity of equities as an investment strategy demands an explanation. In terms of data this means that the information derivatives approach needs to explain not just the realized equities performance but also the investor-expected equity premia. The data suggest the long-term equity investments have been very good at delivering on the theoretical expectations. This explains the viability of the strategy in addition to its performance (i.e. in addition to the equity premium).

=== Market failure explanations ===
Two broad classes of market failure have been considered as explanations of the equity premium.

First, problems of adverse selection and moral hazard may result in the absence of markets in which individuals can insure themselves against systematic risk in labor income and noncorporate profits.

Second, transaction costs or liquidity constraints may prevent individuals from smoothing consumption over time. In relation to transaction costs, there are significantly greater costs associated with trading stocks than trading bonds. These include costs to acquire information, broker fees, taxes, load fees and the bid-ask spread. As such, when shareholders attempt to capitalise on the equity premium by adjusting their asset allocation and purchasing more stocks, they incur significant trading costs which eliminate the gains from the equity premium. However, Kocherlakota (1996) contends that there is insufficient evidence to support this proposition and further data about the size and sources of trading costs need to be collected before this proposition could be validated.

=== Denial of equity premium ===
A final possible explanation is that there is no puzzle to explain: that there is no equity premium. This can be argued from a number of ways, all of them being different forms of the argument that we don't have enough statistical power to distinguish the equity premium from zero:

- Selection bias of the US market in studies. The US market was the most successful stock market in the 20th century. Other countries' markets displayed lower long-run returns (but still with positive equity premiums). Picking the best observation (US) from a sample leads to upwardly biased estimates of the premium.
- Survivorship bias of exchanges: This refers to the equity holder's fear about an economic crash such as the 1929 stock market crash eventuating, even when the probability of that event occurring is minute. The justification here is that over half of the stock exchanges that were operating in early 1900s were discontinued, and the equity risk premium calculated does not account for this. As such, the equity risk premium is "calculated for a survivor" such that if returns from these stock exchanges were included in the calculations, there may not have been such a great disparity between returns gleaned from bonds compared to stocks. However, this hypothesis cannot be easily proven and Mehra and Prescott (1985) in their studies, included the effect on the equity returns following the Great Depression. Although shares lost 80% of their value, comparisons of returns from stocks against bonds showed that even in those periods, significantly higher returns were gained from investing in stocks.
- Low number of data points: the period 1900–2005 provides only 105 years which is not a large enough sample size to run statistical analyses with full confidence, especially in view of the black swan effect.
- Windowing: returns of equities (and relative returns) vary greatly depending on which points are included. Using data starting from the top of the market in 1929 or starting from the bottom of the market in 1932 (leading to estimates of equity premium of 1% lower per year), or ending at the top in 2000 (vs. bottom in 2002) or top in 2007 (vs. bottom in 2009 or beyond) completely change the overall conclusion. However, in all windows considered, the equity premium is always greater than zero.

A related criticism is that the apparent equity premium is an artifact of observing stock market bubbles in progress.

- David Blitz, head of Quant Research at Robeco, suggested that the size of the equity premium is not as large as widely believed. It is usually calculated, he said, on the presumption that the true risk-free asset is the one month T bill. If one recalculates, taking the five-year T-bond as the risk free asset, the equity premium is smaller and the risk-return relation becomes more positive.

Note however that most mainstream economists agree that the evidence shows substantial statistical power. Benartzi & Thaler analyzed the equity returns over a 200-year period, between 1802 and 1990 and found that whilst equity returns were remained stable between 5.5% and 6.5%, return on government bonds fell significantly from around 5% to 0.5%. Moreover, analysis of how faculty members funded their retirement showed that people who had invested in stocks received much higher returns than people who had invested in government bonds.

== Implications ==
Implications for the Individual Investor

For the individual investor, the equity premium may represent a reasonable reward for taking on the risk of buying shares such that they base their decisions to allocate assets to shares or bonds depending on how risk tolerant or risk averse they are. On the other hand, if the investor believes that the equity premium arise from mistakes and fears, they would capitalize on that fear and mistake and invest considerable portions of their assets in shares. Here, it is prudent to note that economists more commonly allocate significant portions of their asset in shares.

Currently, the equity premium is estimated to be 3%. Although this is lower than historical rates, it is still significantly more advantageous than bonds for investors investing in their retirements funds and other long-term funds.

The magnitude of the equity premium brings about substantial implications for policy, welfare and also resource allocation.

Policy and Welfare Implications

Campbell and Cochrane (1995) have found in a study of a model that simulates equity premium value's consistent with asset prices, welfare costs are similar in magnitude to welfare benefits. Therefore essentially, a large risk premium in society where asset prices are a reflection of consumer preferences, implies that the cost of welfare is also large. It also means that in recessions, welfare costs are excessive regardless of aggregate consumption. As the equity premium rises, recession-state income marginal values steadily increase also thus further increasing the welfare costs of recessions. This also brings about questions regarding the need for microeconomic policies that operate by way of higher productivity in the long run by trading off short-term pain in the form of adjustment costs. Given the impact on welfare through recessions and the large equity premium, it is evident that these short-term trade offs as a result of economic policy are likely not ideal, and would be preferred to take place in times of normal economic activity.

Resource Allocation

When there is a large risk premium associated with equity, there is a high cost of systematic risk in returns. One of these being its potential implications on individual portfolio decisions. Some research has argued that high rates of return are just signs of misplaced risk-aversion in which investors are able to earn high returns with little risk from switching from stocks to other assets such as bonds. Research on the contrary indicates that a large percentage of the general public believe that the stock market is best for investors that are in it for the long haul and may also link to another implication being trends in the equity premium. Some claims have been made that the equity premium has declined over time in the past few years and may be supported by other studies claiming that tax declines may also continue to reduce the premium and the fact that transaction costs in securities markets decline this is consistent with a declining premium. The trend implication is also supported by models such as 'noise traders' that create a cyclical premium due to noise traders being excessively optimistic thus declining the premium, and vice versa when the optimism is replaced with pessimism, this would explain the constant decline of equity premium as a stock price bubble.

== See also ==
- Excess volatility puzzle
- Ellsberg paradox
- Fed model
- Loss aversion
- Risk aversion
- List of cognitive biases
- Economic puzzle
- Forward premium anomaly
- Real exchange-rate puzzles
