= Anusha Chari =

Indian-American economist and academic

- Education: Delhi University; Balliol College, Oxford; UCLA Anderson School of Management
- Scientific career
- Fields: Macroeconomics, international finance
- Workplaces: Gerald R. Ford School of Public Policy, University of North Carolina at Chapel Hill
- Website: econ.unc.edu/directory/achari/

Anusha Chari is an Indian-American economist who is a professor of economics and finance at the University of North Carolina at Chapel Hill, where she directs the Modern Indian Studies Initiative. She is also a research associate of the National Bureau of Economic Research in the international finance and macroeconomics programs, a research fellow of the Center for Economic and Policy Research, a senior research fellow of the Kenan Institute of Private Enterprise, and the Deepak and Neera Raj Center on Indian Economic Policies of Columbia University.

She is the president of the International Economics and Finance Society and chairs the American Economic Association's Committee on the Status of Women in the Economics Profession.

== Early life and education ==
Chari grew up in India, where her father was a senior government official and her mother is the Chairperson of the Book Review Literary Trust. She studied economics in India, receiving a college degree from Delhi University, and then a B.A. in Philosophy, Politics, and Economics from Balliol College of Oxford University in 1992, and a PhD in business economics from UCLA Anderson School of Management in 2000.

== Career ==
Chari was a visiting assistant professor at the Booth School of Business at the University of Chicago from 1999 to 2001, and then a faculty member at the Ford School of Public Policy at the University of Michigan from 2001 to 2008. She joined the faculty of the University of North Carolina at Chapel Hill in 2008. In 2011, she served as a special advisor on the Economic Advisory Council to the Prime Minister of India. Her research focuses on the impact of financial globalization and the financial systems of emerging markets.

=== Selected works ===
- Chari, Anusha, and Peter Blair Henry. "Risk sharing and asset prices: evidence from a natural experiment." The Journal of Finance 59, no. 3 (2004): 1295–1324.
- Chari, Anusha, Paige P. Ouimet, and Linda L. Tesar. "The value of control in emerging markets." The Review of Financial Studies 23, no. 4 (2010): 1741–1770.
- Chari, Anusha, Wenjie Chen, and Kathryn ME Dominguez. "Foreign ownership and firm performance: Emerging market acquisitions in the United States." IMF Economic Review 60, no. 1 (2012): 1-42.
- Chari, Anusha, and Peter Blair Henry. "Firm-specific information and the efficiency of investment." Journal of Financial Economics 87, no. 3 (2008): 636–655.
- Alfaro, Laura, Gonzalo Asis, Anusha Chari, and Ugo Panizza. "Corporate debt, firm size and financial fragility in emerging markets." Journal of International Economics 118 (2019): 1–19.
