= Rajnish Mehra =

Indian American economist

- Born: January 15, 1950 (age 76)

Academic background
- Education: IIT Kanpur; Rice University; Carnegie Mellon University
- Influences: Edward C. Prescott

Academic work
- Discipline: Financial economics Quantitative finance
- Institutions: Arizona State University, National Bureau of Economic Research
- Website: Information at IDEAS / RePEc

Rajnish Mehra (Hindi: रजनीश मेहरा; born January 15, 1950) is an Indian American financial economist. He currently holds the E.N. Basha Arizona Heritage Endowed Chair at the Arizona State University and is a Professor of Economics Emeritus at the University of California, Santa Barbara.

== Education ==
Mehra received his doctorate in industrial administration from Carnegie Mellon University (1978), an M.S. in computer science from Rice University (1974), and a BTech in electrical engineering from the Indian Institute of Technology, Kanpur (1972). He spent a year studying mathematics at St. Stephen's College, Delhi University (1966–67).

== Career ==
In 1976, he was appointed assistant professor at the School of Business, Queen's University in Kingston, Canada. He subsequently moved to the Columbia Business School in 1977, and in 1985 to the University of California, Santa Barbara, where he taught until 2010. He was department chair from 2001 to 2004. From 2012 to 2016 he held the Deutsche Bank Chair at the University of Luxembourg.

His visiting appointments include MIT Sloan School of Management (1987–89 and 2004–5), the University of Chicago Booth School of Business (1995–2006) and non-resident senior fellow at the National Council of Applied Economic Research, New Delhi (2016–present).

He has been a consultant to the Fixed Income Group at Salomon Smith Barney and an advisor to Vega Asset Management.

== Main research contributions ==
=== Recursive equilibrium theory ===
He is probably best known for his contributions to recursive competitive theory, an equilibrium concept widely used in modern dynamic macroeconomics, which he developed jointly with Edward C. Prescott.

=== Determinants of the equity premium ===
Another strand of his research focuses on understanding the determinants of the 'equity premium', the return earned by a diversified portfolio of stocks (such as the S&P 500) in excess of that earned by a risk-free security such as a Treasury Bill. In 1979 he and Edward C. Prescott observed that the real equity premium over the past 90 years in the US was 6.18%, an order of magnitude larger than that could be rationalized by neo-classical economic theory. They termed this the 'equity premium puzzle'. Attempts to resolve the puzzle have become a major research impetus in both finance and macroeconomics over the past thirty years.

== See also ==
- Excess volatility puzzle
