= David C. Blitz =

Dutch econometrician and quantitative researcher

- Born: July 24, 1973 (age 53); Netherlands
- Occupation: Economist
- Children: 3

Academic background
- Education: Erasmus University Rotterdam

Academic work
- Discipline: Econometrics
- Institutions: Robeco

David C. Blitz (born 24 July 1973) is a Dutch econometrician and quantitative researcher on financial markets. He is a founding researcher of Robeco Quantitative Investments.

== Education ==
Blitz holds a PhD in Finance and a Master's in Econometrics (cum laude) from Erasmus University Rotterdam.

== Career ==
Blitz, chief researcher at Robeco, has spent most of his career on designing and developing the quantitative investment strategies. Blitz serves on the advisory editorial board of the Journal of Portfolio Management. He has published over 25 of articles in peer-reviewed academic journals, such as the Financial Analyst Journal, Journal of Empirical Finance, and European Financial Management. Blitz started his career in the investment industry at Robeco in 1995. He specializes in low-volatility investing and factor investing challenging the classical Capital Asset Pricing Model and the Fama French factor models. His research on quantitative investing is often quoted in financial media such as Institutional Investor or the Financial times. His work on ESG and sin stocks was cited in The Economist in 2017 and by the Financial Times in 2021 and 2022.

== Selected academic publications ==
David has written many academic papers with practical relevance for investors, with significant contributions to the low-volatility anomaly. His co-authors include Frank Fabozzi, Eric Falkenstein, and Pim van Vliet. Most of his work is published in journals for financial practitioners like the Journal of Portfolio Management. As of 2023 his Google scholar h-index is 13 (Scopus) and 24 (Google). His research papers have been downloaded more than 100,000 times making him a top #100 author out of >30,000 authors. His most cited publications are:

- The Volatility Effect: Lower Risk without Lower Returns, Journal of Portfolio Management, 2007.
- Five Concerns with the Five-Factor model, Journal of Portfolio Management, 2016.
- Residual Momentum, Journal of Empirical Finance, 2011.
- Global Tactical Cross-Asset Allocation: Applying Value and Momentum Across Asset Classes, Journal of Portfolio Management, 2008.
- The Conservative Formula: Quantitative Investing made easy, Journal of Portfolio Management, 2018
- When Equity Factors Drop Their Shorts, Financial Analyst Journal, 2020.

== Recognition and awards ==
Peter L Bernstein Award 2018 Winner. Issued by Portfolio Management Research Journal Series. Jan 2018. For paper "Are Hedge Funds on the Other Side of the Low-Volatility Trade" in the Journal of Alternative Investments and interviewed by Ronald Kahn. Citation of Excellence Award Issued by Emerald for paper "The Volatility Effect: Lower Risk without Lower Returns" in the Journal of Portfolio Management.

== Personal life ==
David has three children and lives in Barendrecht, The Netherlands. His great-grandfather Carel Blitz was a Dutch violist.

== See also ==
- Low-volatility investing
- Momentum investing
- Factor investing
