= Charles Horioka =

Japanese-American economist

Charles Yuji Horioka
- Born: September 7, 1956 (age 70); Boston, Massachusetts

Academic background
- Education: Harvard University
- Doctoral advisor: Dale W. Jorgenson
- Influences: Martin Feldstein

Academic work
- Discipline: Economics
- Institutions: Kobe University
- Notable ideas: Feldstein–Horioka puzzle
- Awards: Nakahara Prize (2001)
- Website: Information at IDEAS / RePEc

Charles Yuji Horioka (born September 7, 1956, in Boston, Massachusetts) is a Japanese-American economist residing in Japan.

== Education and career ==
Horioka received his B.A. and Ph.D. degrees from Harvard University and is currently Research Professor at the Center for Computational Social Science and Research Fellow at the Research Institute for Economics and Business Administration, Kobe University, Kobe, Japan. He is concurrently Distinguished Research Professor and Director at the Asian Growth Research Institute (Kitakyushu City, Japan) and Invited Professor and Professor Emeritus at the Institute of Social and Economic Research, Osaka University (Osaka, Japan). Previously, he taught at Stanford, Columbia, Kyoto, and Osaka Universities and the University of the Philippines, Diliman, where he was Vea Family Professor of Technology and Evolutionary Economics Centennial. He served as President of the Society of Economics of the Household (SEHO) 2021–23, President of the Japanese Economic Association 2023–24, and President of the International Association for Research on Income and Wealth (IARIW) 2024–26. He served as co-editor of the International Economic Review for 15 years (from 1998 until 2013) and is currently co-editor of the Review of Economics of the Household and associate editor or editorial advisor of many economics journals. He is also a Research Associate and Co-director of the Japan Project of the National Bureau of Economic Research (NBER, Cambridge, Massachusetts).

In his article with Martin Feldstein, "Domestic Saving and International Capital Flows", published in the Economic Journal in 1980, Horioka documented a positive correlation between long-term savings and investment rates across countries. This result has come to be known as the Feldstein–Horioka puzzle or paradox and the article is one of the most cited in international finance. His specialties are macroeconomics, household and family economics, the Japanese economy, and the Asian economies, and he has written numerous scholarly articles on consumption, saving, and bequest behavior and parent-child relations in Japan, the United States, China, India, Korea, and Asia more generally.

In 2001, Horioka was awarded the Seventh Japanese Economic Association Nakahara Prize (the Japanese equivalent of the John Bates Clark Medal), which is given annually to the most outstanding Japanese economist aged 45 or younger. According to the Research Papers in Economics (RePEc)/IDEAS rankings, he ranks among the top ten economists living in Japan and has about 11,500 Google Scholar citations.
