= Home bias in trade puzzle =

Problem in international economics

The home bias in trade puzzle is a widely discussed problem in macroeconomics and international finance, first documented by John T. McCallum in an article from 1995.

McCallum showed that for the United States and Canada, inter-province trade is 20 times larger than international trade, holding other determinants of trade fixed. Subsequent estimates by John F. Helliwell and others have whittled this bias down to a factor from 6 to 12. This home bias in trade has later been documented among OECD countries. The preferred explanation for this finding has been the presence of formal and informal trade barriers following national borders. Another possible solution to the fact that domestic trade is 20 times larger than international trade could be that domestically traders speak the same language.

If presence of formal and informal trade barriers following national borders was the sole reason for this puzzle, home bias should not exist on the subnational level. Wolf (2000) finds, however, that home bias is present also within U.S. states.

Maurice Obstfeld and Kenneth Rogoff identify this as one of the six major puzzles in international economics. The others are the Feldstein-Horioka puzzle, the equity home bias puzzle, the consumption correlations puzzle, the purchasing power and exchange rate disconnect puzzle, and the Baxter-Stockman neutrality of exchange rate regime puzzle.
