= Eric Falkenstein =

American financial economist

Eric Falkenstein (born 14 August 1965) is an American financial economist and an expert in the field of low-volatility investing. He is an academic researcher, blogger, quant portfolio manager, and book author.

== Education ==
Falkenstein received his economics PhD from Northwestern University in 1994, and wrote his dissertation on the low return to high volatility stocks.

== Career ==
He was a teaching assistant for Hyman Minsky at Washington University in St. Louis. He set up a value at risk system for trading operations at KeyCorp bank, then a firm-wide economic risk capital allocation methodology. He was a founding researcher of RiskCalc, Moody's private firm default probability model, the premier private firm default model in the world. He has been an equity portfolio manager at Pine River Capital Management and developed trading algorithms for Walleye Software. He is currently working on Ethereum contracts.

=== Writing ===
Falkenstein has blogged for many years and was among the top influencer bloggers according to the Wall Street Journal. He has written articles that were published in The Journal of Finance, The Journal of Fixed Income and Derivatives Quarterly.

He has written two books: Finding Alpha: The Search for Alpha When Risk and Return Break Down (Wiley, 2009) and self-published The Missing Risk Premium: Why Low Volatility Investing Works in 2012.

== Personal life ==
Eric has been a libertarian and became a Christian in March 2016. He is married and has three children.
