= Backus–Smith puzzle =

Paradox in economics

In economics, the Backus–Smith puzzle or consumption – real-exchange-rate anomaly is the observation that the correlation between consumption and real exchange rates is zero or negative. This is contrary to economic theory which predicts that with full risk sharing, relative consumption should be perfectly correlated with the real exchange rate. Countries with relative low prices should receive a transfer to take advantage of cheap consumption. This anomaly was first documented by David K. Backus and Gregor W. Smith in 1993.
