= Feldstein–Horioka puzzle =

Problem in financial theory

The Feldstein–Horioka puzzle is a widely discussed problem in macroeconomics and international finance, which was first documented by Martin Feldstein and Charles Horioka in a 1980 paper. Economic theory assumes that if investors can easily invest anywhere in the world, acting rationally they would invest in countries offering the highest return per unit of investment. This would drive up the price of the investment until the return across different countries is similar.

The discussion stems from the economic theory that capital flows act to equalize marginal product of capital across nations. In other words, money flows from lower to higher marginal products until the increased investment equalizes the return with that obtainable elsewhere. According to standard economic theory, in the absence of regulation in international financial markets, the savings of any country would flow to countries with the most productive investment opportunities. Therefore, domestic saving rates would be uncorrelated with domestic investment rates. This is the same fundamental insight which underlies several other results in economics like the Fisher separation theorem.

Feldstein and Horioka argued that if the assumption is true and there is perfect capital mobility, we should observe low correlation between domestic investment and savings. Borrowers in a country would not need the funds from domestic savers if they could borrow from international markets at world rates. Similarly, savers as savers would show no preference for investing within their own country, but would lend to foreign investors and would not need to lend domestically. For example, a saver in France would have no incentive to invest in the French economy, but would invest in the economy which offers the highest return on capital. Therefore, increased saving rates within one country need not result in increased investment. However, statistical data does not bear this out.

For example, if the capital flows between OECD countries are reasonably free, this should hold true in those countries. But Feldstein and Horioka observed that domestic savings rates and domestic investment rates are highly correlated, in contrast to standard economic theory.

Maurice Obstfeld and Kenneth Rogoff identify this as one of the six major puzzles in international economics. The others are the home bias in trade puzzle, the equity home bias puzzle, the consumption correlations puzzle, the purchasing power and exchange rate disconnect puzzle, and the Baxter–Stockman neutrality of exchange rate regime puzzle.

Feldstein and Horioka's assumption of perfect capital mobility discounts factors such as:

- differential tax treatment. For example, New Zealand, an OECD member, has a tax regime which penalises outward foreign investment
- differential dealing costs, custody fees, and management fees, which are typically higher for foreign instruments
- the risk of exchange rates moving adversely to the investor
- information asymmetry; targets for foreign investment may be less well-known than domestic ones, and information about them may be harder to obtain or written in a foreign language
- regulatory risk; serious mismatches between savings and investment levels are seen as undesirable by many national central banks and by supranational institutions such as the International Monetary Fund, and consequent changes to public policy may disadvantage investors.

All these apply to the hypothetical rational investor. Additionally, some investors are chauvinistic, seeing it as more patriotic to invest domestically; a view encouraged by some governments.

Economists Claudio Borio and Piti Disyatat of the Bank for International Settlements have argued that the Feldstein–Horioka puzzle arises due to mainstream economic modeling approaches which equate saving in real terms with financing in money terms. Using a framework in which the saving–investment nexus is distinct from money financing, Borio and Disyatat contend that the Feldstein–Horioka puzzle is not a puzzle at all. Instead, it is a result of the "failure to maintain a clear distinction between net resource flows and financing flows."

== See also ==
- Lucas paradox
