= Excess volatility puzzle =

== Shiller's excess volatility puzzle ==
Under the assumption that investors are rational and the stock market is efficient, the price of a stock should equal the present value of its expected future dividends. Because those dividends are uncertain, price movements should reflect rational revisions of investors' expectations about them. In 1981, Robert Shiller tested this proposition using long historical series of U.S. stock prices and dividends. He found that actual stock prices fluctuated far more than the discounted value of the dividends subsequently paid, which posed a puzzle. Stephen LeRoy and Richard Porter independently reached a similar conclusion in the same year. Later work by John Campbell and Shiller suggested that changes in expected dividends account for only between one-third and one-half of stock market fluctuations.

== Some explanations of excess volatility ==
In the core neoclassical model, an investor values a stock by considering the stream of uncertain future dividends from that stock. The investor calculates the utility of each future payoff according to his or her risk appetite, often coming from a specified risk-aversion parameter, and weights that utility by a discount factor, which reflects how much less the investor values payoffs that arrive further in the future. The interaction of many investors' valuations in the market produces the observed stock price. A number of authors have attempted to explain excess volatility using variations of this model, other models of valuation, and different specifications of the economic environment.

One line of research attributes excess volatility to variation over time in the risk appetite of investors. Among the reasons that have been advanced for such variation is habit formation. In the analysis of John Campbell and John Cochrane, investors judge their consumption relative to a slowly moving habitual level. When consumption falls toward that level, as in a recession, investors' appetite for risk declines, and the price that they are willing to pay for stocks drops, which lowers stock prices. Conversely, when consumption rises above it, their appetite for risk increases, and stock prices rise. Because risk appetite varies over the business cycle while dividends change little, stock prices fluctuate more than dividends alone would justify. Another reason for the variation in risk appetite that has been researched is changing perceptions of the likelihood or severity of rare economic disasters, such as depressions. In the analyses of Xavier Gabaix and Jessica Wachter, as the perceived risk of such a disaster rises, investors' appetite for risk decreases, and stock prices fall. As the perceived risk decreases, on the other hand, investors' appetite for risk increases, and stock prices rise. Because perceived disaster risk can change even when dividends do not, stock prices fluctuate more than dividends alone would justify.

Another group of explanations is based on investors' learning. In some versions, such as the analyses of Robert Barsky, J. Bradford De Long, and Allan Timmermann, investors do not know the process that generates dividends and must learn about it. Because stock prices depend on dividends far into the future, even a small revision in investors' estimate of the long-run growth rate of dividends can produce a large change in stock prices. In other versions, investors try to learn about the prices at which they can later sell their stocks, because for many investors the resale price matters more than the dividends they receive. In the analysis of Klaus Adam, Albert Marcet, and Juan Pablo Nicolini, investors use statistical updating to estimate the growth rate of prices as a weighted average of past observed growth rates, with recent ones weighted more (the authors posit that investors believe that the trend in the growth rate of prices is changing). A rise in prices raises this estimate, which leads investors to pay more and pushes stock prices up further. But prices can outpace dividends only while the estimate keeps rising, and as the estimate catches up with recent price growth, the rise stalls and then reverses.

The "noise traders hypothesis" of J. Bradford De Long, Andrei Shleifer, Lawrence Summers, and Robert Waldmann focuses on investors who are not fully rational. In their analysis, some investors, called noise traders, trade on beliefs that are unrelated to fundamentals and that change unpredictably. Rational investors could profit by trading against them but are reluctant to do so, because the noise traders' beliefs might push prices even further from fundamental values before prices correct. As a result, mispricing persists, and stock prices fluctuate more than fundamentals alone would justify.

The Mehra-Sah mood hypothesis of Rajnish Mehra and Raaj Sah proposes that an individual's mood fluctuates involuntarily on time scales from minutes to decades, yet the individual, also involuntarily, believes that the current mood will last a long time, if not forever. Thus, every small change in mood leads investors to revalue the entire stream of future dividends, and this revaluation can amplify the volatility of stock prices almost regardless of the cognitive apparatus that investors use for valuing stocks (for example, whether or not it is the core neoclassical model). Using the illustration of the core neoclassical model, they show that a standard deviation of only 0.1 percent in the discount factor can be amplified into a standard deviation of 3–4 percent in stock prices.
