= Equity home bias puzzle =

In finance and investing, the Home bias puzzle is the term given to describe the fact that individuals and institutions in most countries hold only modest amounts of foreign equity, and tend to strongly favor company stock from their home nation. This finding is regarded as puzzling, since ample evidence shows equity portfolios obtain substantial benefits from diversification into global stocks. Maurice Obstfeld and Kenneth Rogoff identified this as one of the six major puzzles in international macroeconomics.

== Overview ==
Home bias in equities is a behavioral finance phenomenon and it was first studied in an academic context by Kenneth French and James M. Poterba (1991) and Tesar and Werner (1995).

Coval and Moskowitz (1999) showed that home bias is not limited to international portfolios, but that the preference for investing close to home also applies to portfolios of domestic stocks. Specifically, they showed that U.S. investment managers often exhibit a strong preference for locally headquartered firms, particularly small, highly leveraged firms that produce nontradable goods.

Home bias also creates some less obvious problems for investors: by diminishing the cost of capital for companies it limits the shareholders' ability to influence management by threatening to walk out. It partly explains why foreign investors tend to be better at monitoring firms they invest into.

The home bias, which was prevalent in the 1970s and 1980s, is still present in emerging market countries, but there are some recent data showing some support for the decline in the equity home bias in developed market countries.

The benefit from holding a more equally diversified portfolio of domestic and foreign assets is a lower volatility portfolio. On average, US investors carried only 8% of their assets in foreign investments. Historical data indicates that holding an entirely domestic US portfolio would result in lower volatility of returns than an entirely foreign portfolio. A study conducted by economist Karen Lewis found that a weight of 39% on foreign assets and 61% on domestic US assets produced the minimum volatility portfolio for investors. Foreign asset exposure has been on the rise in the past few years, however with the average US portfolio carrying 28% foreign assets in 2010 as opposed to just 12% in 2001.

Country	Home equity bias (%)
USA	78
Norway	12
Canada	49
Denmark	40
Australia	33
Eurozone	46
UK	19
Sweden	50
New Zealand	53
Switzerland	32
Japan	78

== Attempts to resolve the puzzle ==
One hypothesis is that capital is internationally immobile across countries, yet this is hard to believe given the volume of international capital flows among countries.

Another hypothesis is that investors have superior access to information about local firms or economic conditions. But as Stijn Van Nieuwerburgh and Laura Veldkamp (2005) point out, this seems to replace the assumption of capital immobility with the assumption of information immobility. The effect of an increase in trade and the development of the Internet support the hypothesis about information immobility as well as information asymmetry.

In some countries, like Belgium, holding stocks of foreign companies implies a double taxation on dividends, once in the country of the company and once in the country of the stockholder, while domestic stock dividends are taxed only once.

In addition, liability hedging and the perception of foreign exchange risk are other possible causes of the home bias.

== See also ==
- FTSE Global Equity Index Series, containing the market capitalisation of a wide range of countries
- List of countries by GDP (nominal)
