= HDY =

HDY may refer to:

- Hadiyya language, spoken in Ethiopia
- Hardy Oil and Gas, a British company (1997–2019; LSE:HDY)
- Hat Yai International Airport, Thailand
- Headingley railway station, England
- Heredity (journal), published since 1947
- High-yield stocks, in finance
