= Dividend investing =

Dividend investing is an investment style that prefers stocks which pay a dividend.

Dividend-paying stocks may be preferred because of a desire by investors for cashflow, or because companies which pay dividends may tend to be large and relatively stable.

Dividend investment as a style has been criticised as irrational, because when a company pays a dividend its stock price should fall by an equivalent amount. Companies can also return cash to shareholders through stock buybacks, or retain and reinvest it. Investors should instead look at the total return of a stock.

Stocks which pay dividends may be receive less favourable tax treatment.

Dividend stocks tend to be exposed to the value, profitability, and investment factors, which explains outperformance.

== See also ==
- Dividend
- Dogs of the Dow
- Dividend aristocrat
