= Historical components of the Dow Jones Industrial Average =

The Dow Jones Industrial Average, an American stock index composed of 30 large companies, has changed its components 60 times since its inception, on May 26, 1896. General Electric had the longest presence on the index, beginning in the original index in 1896 and ending in 2018, but was dropped and re-added twice between 1898 and 1907. As this is a historical listing, the names here are the full legal name of the corporation on that date, with abbreviations and punctuation according to the corporation's own usage. An up arrow ( ↑ ) indicates the company is added. A down arrow ( ↓ ) indicates the company is removed. A dagger ( † ) indicates a change of corporate name.

== Summary of changes since 1991 ==
Changes to the index since 1991 are as follows:

- On May 6, 1991, Caterpillar Inc., J.P. Morgan & Co., and The Walt Disney Company replaced Navistar, Primerica, and U.S. Steel.
- On March 17, 1997, Travelers Inc., Hewlett-Packard, Johnson & Johnson, and Walmart replaced Westinghouse Electric, Texaco, Bethlehem Steel, and F. W. Woolworth Company.
- On November 1, 1999, Microsoft, Intel, SBC Communications, and Home Depot replaced Goodyear Tire, Sears Roebuck, Union Carbide, and Chevron Corporation. Intel and Microsoft became the first and second companies traded on the Nasdaq to be part of the Dow.
- On April 8, 2004, American International Group, Pfizer, and Verizon Communications replaced AT&T Corporation, Kodak, and International Paper.
- On February 19, 2008, Chevron Corporation and Bank of America replaced Altria Group and Honeywell. Chevron was previously a Dow component from July 18, 1930, to November 1, 1999. During Chevron's absence, its split-adjusted price per share went from $44 to $85, while the price of petroleum rose from $24 to $100 per barrel.
- On September 22, 2008, Kraft Foods Inc. replaced American International Group (AIG) in the index.
- On June 8, 2009, The Travelers Companies and Cisco Systems replaced Motors Liquidation Company (formerly General Motors) and Citigroup. Cisco became the third company traded on the NASDAQ to be part of the Dow.
- On September 24, 2012, UnitedHealth Group replaced Kraft Foods Inc. following Kraft's split into Mondelez International and Kraft Foods.
- On September 23, 2013, Goldman Sachs, Nike, Inc., and Visa Inc. replaced Alcoa, Bank of America, and Hewlett-Packard.
- On March 19, 2015, Apple Inc. replaced AT&T, which had been a component of the DJIA since November 1916 (except for a hiatus from 2004 to the SBC merger in 2005). Apple became the fourth company traded on the NASDAQ to be part of the Dow.
- On September 1, 2017, DowDuPont replaced DuPont. DowDuPont was formed by the merger of Dow Chemical Company with DuPont.
- On June 26, 2018, Walgreens Boots Alliance replaced General Electric, which had been a component of the DJIA since November 1907, after being part of the inaugural index in May 1896 and much of the 1896 to 1907 period.
- On April 2, 2019, Dow Inc. replaced DowDuPont. Dow, Inc. is a spin-off of DowDuPont, itself a merger of Dow Chemical Company and DuPont.
- On April 6, 2020, Raytheon Technologies replaced United Technologies. Raytheon is the name of the combination of United Technologies and the Raytheon Company, which merged as of April 3, 2020. The newly combined conglomerate does not include previous subsidiaries Carrier Global or Otis Worldwide.
- On August 31, 2020, Amgen, Honeywell, and Salesforce.com replaced ExxonMobil, Pfizer, and Raytheon Technologies.
- On February 26, 2024, Amazon replaced Walgreens Boots Alliance.
- On November 8, 2024, Nvidia replaced Intel, and Sherwin-Williams replaced Dow Inc.
- On June 29, 2026, Alphabet replaced Verizon Communications.

== June 29, 2026 ==
3M Company	The Coca-Cola Company	Nike, Inc.
Alphabet Inc. ↑	The Goldman Sachs Group, Inc.	Nvidia Corporation
Amazon.com, Inc.	The Home Depot, Inc.	The Procter & Gamble Company
American Express Company	Honeywell Technologies Inc. † (formerly Honeywell International Inc.)	Salesforce, Inc.
Amgen Inc.	International Business Machines Corporation	The Sherwin-Williams Company
Apple Inc.	Johnson & Johnson	The Travelers Companies, Inc.
The Boeing Company	JPMorgan Chase & Co.	UnitedHealth Group Incorporated
Caterpillar Inc.	McDonald's Corporation	Visa Inc.
Chevron Corporation	Merck & Co., Inc.	Walmart Inc.
Cisco Systems, Inc.	Microsoft Corporation	The Walt Disney Company
Dropped from Average
Verizon Communications Inc. ↓		

Honeywell International Inc. spun off Honeywell Aerospace Inc. Post spin-off, the Honeywell parent will remain in the DJIA under the new name Honeywell Technologies Inc. Honeywell Aerospace will not be included in the DJIA. Verizon represents only one-half of one percentage point of the DJIA due to its lower share price.

== November 8, 2024 ==
3M Company	The Goldman Sachs Group, Inc.	Nvidia Corporation ↑
Amazon.com, Inc.	The Home Depot, Inc.	The Procter & Gamble Company
American Express Company	Honeywell International Inc.	Salesforce, Inc.
Amgen Inc.	International Business Machines Corporation	The Sherwin-Williams Company ↑
Apple Inc.	Johnson & Johnson	The Travelers Companies, Inc.
The Boeing Company	JPMorgan Chase & Co.	UnitedHealth Group Incorporated
Caterpillar Inc.	McDonald's Corporation	Verizon Communications Inc.
Chevron Corporation	Merck & Co., Inc.	Visa Inc.
Cisco Systems, Inc.	Microsoft Corporation	Walmart Inc.
The Coca-Cola Company	Nike, Inc.	The Walt Disney Company
Dropped from Average
Dow Inc. ↓	Intel Corporation ↓	

== February 26, 2024 ==
3M Company	Dow Inc.	Microsoft Corporation
Amazon.com, Inc. ↑	The Goldman Sachs Group, Inc.	Nike, Inc.
American Express Company	The Home Depot, Inc.	The Procter & Gamble Company
Amgen Inc.	Honeywell International Inc.	Salesforce, Inc.
Apple Inc.	Intel Corporation	The Travelers Companies, Inc.
The Boeing Company	International Business Machines Corporation	UnitedHealth Group Incorporated
Caterpillar Inc.	Johnson & Johnson	Verizon Communications Inc.
Chevron Corporation	JPMorgan Chase & Co.	Visa Inc.
Cisco Systems, Inc.	McDonald's Corporation	Walmart Inc.
The Coca-Cola Company	Merck & Co., Inc.	The Walt Disney Company
Dropped from Average
Walgreens Boots Alliance, Inc. ↓		

The index change was prompted by DJIA constituent Walmart Inc.’s decision to split its stock 3:1 thereby reducing Walmart’s index weight due to the price weighted construction of the index. Walmart will remain in the DJIA.

== August 31, 2020 ==
3M Company	The Goldman Sachs Group, Inc.	Nike, Inc.
American Express Company	The Home Depot, Inc.	The Procter & Gamble Company
Amgen Inc. ↑	Honeywell International Inc. ↑	Salesforce, Inc. ↑ (formerly salesforce.com, inc.)
Apple Inc.	Intel Corporation	The Travelers Companies, Inc.
The Boeing Company	International Business Machines Corporation	UnitedHealth Group Incorporated
Caterpillar Inc.	Johnson & Johnson	Verizon Communications Inc.
Chevron Corporation	JPMorgan Chase & Co.	Visa Inc.
Cisco Systems, Inc.	McDonald's Corporation	Walgreens Boots Alliance, Inc.
The Coca-Cola Company	Merck & Co., Inc.	Walmart Inc.
Dow Inc.	Microsoft Corporation	The Walt Disney Company
Dropped from Average
Exxon Mobil Corporation ↓	Pfizer Inc. ↓	Raytheon Technologies Corporation ↓

== April 6, 2020 ==
3M Company	The Goldman Sachs Group, Inc.	Pfizer Inc.
American Express Company	The Home Depot, Inc.	The Procter & Gamble Company
Apple Inc.	Intel Corporation	Raytheon Technologies Corporation ↑
The Boeing Company	International Business Machines Corporation	The Travelers Companies, Inc.
Caterpillar Inc.	Johnson & Johnson	UnitedHealth Group Incorporated
Chevron Corporation	JPMorgan Chase & Co.	Verizon Communications Inc.
Cisco Systems, Inc.	McDonald's Corporation	Visa Inc.
The Coca-Cola Company	Merck & Co., Inc.	Walgreens Boots Alliance, Inc.
Dow Inc.	Microsoft Corporation	Walmart Inc.
Exxon Mobil Corporation	Nike, Inc.	The Walt Disney Company
Dropped from Average
United Technologies Corporation ↓		

United Technologies Corporation merged with Raytheon Company and new corporation entered index as Raytheon Technologies Corporation.

== April 2, 2019 ==
3M Company	The Goldman Sachs Group, Inc.	Pfizer Inc.
American Express Company	The Home Depot, Inc.	The Procter & Gamble Company
Apple Inc.	Intel Corporation	The Travelers Companies, Inc.
The Boeing Company	International Business Machines Corporation	UnitedHealth Group Incorporated
Caterpillar Inc.	Johnson & Johnson	United Technologies Corporation
Chevron Corporation	JPMorgan Chase & Co.	Verizon Communications Inc.
Cisco Systems, Inc.	McDonald's Corporation	Visa Inc.
The Coca-Cola Company	Merck & Co., Inc.	Walgreens Boots Alliance, Inc.
Dow Inc. ↑	Microsoft Corporation	Walmart Inc.
Exxon Mobil Corporation	Nike, Inc.	The Walt Disney Company
Dropped from Average
DowDuPont Inc. ↓		

DowDuPont spun off DuPont and was replaced by Dow Inc.

== June 26, 2018 ==
3M Company	The Goldman Sachs Group, Inc.	Pfizer Inc.
American Express Company	The Home Depot, Inc.	The Procter & Gamble Company
Apple Inc.	Intel Corporation	The Travelers Companies, Inc.
The Boeing Company	International Business Machines Corporation	UnitedHealth Group Incorporated
Caterpillar Inc.	Johnson & Johnson	United Technologies Corporation
Chevron Corporation	JPMorgan Chase & Co.	Verizon Communications Inc.
Cisco Systems, Inc.	McDonald's Corporation	Visa Inc.
The Coca-Cola Company	Merck & Co., Inc.	Walgreens Boots Alliance, Inc. ↑
DowDuPont Inc.	Microsoft Corporation	Walmart Inc. (formerly Wal-Mart Stores, Inc.)
Exxon Mobil Corporation	Nike, Inc.	The Walt Disney Company
Dropped from Average
General Electric Company ↓		

== September 1, 2017 ==
3M Company	General Electric Company	Nike, Inc.
American Express Company	The Goldman Sachs Group, Inc.	Pfizer Inc.
Apple Inc.	The Home Depot, Inc.	The Procter & Gamble Company
The Boeing Company	Intel Corporation	The Travelers Companies, Inc.
Caterpillar Inc.	International Business Machines Corporation	UnitedHealth Group Inc.
Chevron Corporation	Johnson & Johnson	United Technologies Corporation
Cisco Systems, Inc.	JPMorgan Chase & Co.	Verizon Communications Inc.
The Coca-Cola Company	McDonald's Corporation	Visa Inc.
DowDuPont Inc. † (formerly E.I. du Pont de Nemours & Company)	Merck & Co., Inc.	Wal-Mart Stores, Inc.
Exxon Mobil Corporation	Microsoft Corporation	The Walt Disney Company

DuPont merged with the Dow Chemical Company under the name DowDuPont.

== March 19, 2015 ==
3M Company	General Electric Company	Nike, Inc.
American Express Company	The Goldman Sachs Group, Inc.	Pfizer Inc.
Apple Inc. ↑	The Home Depot, Inc.	The Procter & Gamble Company
The Boeing Company	Intel Corporation	The Travelers Companies, Inc.
Caterpillar Inc.	International Business Machines Corporation	UnitedHealth Group Inc.
Chevron Corporation	Johnson & Johnson	United Technologies Corporation
Cisco Systems, Inc.	JPMorgan Chase & Co.	Verizon Communications Inc.
The Coca-Cola Company	McDonald's Corporation	Visa Inc.
E.I. du Pont de Nemours & Company	Merck & Co., Inc.	Wal-Mart Stores, Inc.
Exxon Mobil Corporation	Microsoft Corporation	The Walt Disney Company
Dropped from Average
AT&T Inc. ↓		

== September 23, 2013 ==
3M Company	General Electric Company	Nike, Inc. ↑
American Express Company	The Goldman Sachs Group, Inc. ↑	Pfizer Inc.
AT&T Inc.	The Home Depot, Inc.	The Procter & Gamble Company
The Boeing Company	Intel Corporation	The Travelers Companies, Inc.
Caterpillar Inc.	International Business Machines Corporation	UnitedHealth Group Inc.
Chevron Corporation	Johnson & Johnson	United Technologies Corporation
Cisco Systems, Inc.	JPMorgan Chase & Co.	Verizon Communications Inc.
The Coca-Cola Company	McDonald's Corporation	Visa Inc. ↑
E.I. du Pont de Nemours & Company	Merck & Co., Inc.	Wal-Mart Stores, Inc.
Exxon Mobil Corporation	Microsoft Corporation	The Walt Disney Company
Dropped from Average
Alcoa Inc. ↓	Bank of America Corporation ↓	Hewlett-Packard Company ↓

The above changes "were prompted by the low stock price of the three companies slated for removal and the Index Committee's desire to diversify the sector and industry group representation of the index."

== September 24, 2012 ==
3M Company	E.I. du Pont de Nemours & Company	Merck & Co., Inc.
Alcoa Inc.	Exxon Mobil Corporation	Microsoft Corporation
American Express Company	General Electric Company	Pfizer Inc.
AT&T Inc.	Hewlett-Packard Company	The Procter & Gamble Company
Bank of America Corporation	The Home Depot, Inc.	The Travelers Companies, Inc.
The Boeing Company	Intel Corporation	UnitedHealth Group Incorporated ↑
Caterpillar Inc.	International Business Machines Corporation	United Technologies Corporation
Chevron Corporation	Johnson & Johnson	Verizon Communications Inc.
Cisco Systems, Inc.	JPMorgan Chase & Co.	Wal-Mart Stores, Inc.
The Coca-Cola Company	McDonald's Corporation	The Walt Disney Company
Dropped from Average
Kraft Foods Inc. ↓		

== June 8, 2009 ==
3M Company	E.I. du Pont de Nemours & Company	McDonald's Corporation
Alcoa Inc.	Exxon Mobil Corporation	Merck & Co., Inc.
American Express Company	General Electric Company	Microsoft Corporation
AT&T Inc.	Hewlett-Packard Company	Pfizer Inc.
Bank of America Corporation	The Home Depot, Inc.	The Procter & Gamble Company
The Boeing Company	Intel Corporation	The Travelers Companies, Inc. ↑
Caterpillar Inc.	International Business Machines Corporation	United Technologies Corporation
Chevron Corporation	Johnson & Johnson	Verizon Communications Inc.
Cisco Systems, Inc. ↑	JPMorgan Chase & Co.	Wal-Mart Stores, Inc.
The Coca-Cola Company	Kraft Foods Inc.	The Walt Disney Company
Dropped from Average
Citigroup Inc. ↓	General Motors Corporation ↓	

== September 22, 2008 ==
3M Company	E.I. du Pont de Nemours & Company	Kraft Foods Inc. ↑
Alcoa Inc.	Exxon Mobil Corporation	McDonald's Corporation
American Express Company	General Electric Company	Merck & Co., Inc.
AT&T Inc.	General Motors Corporation	Microsoft Corporation
Bank of America Corporation	Hewlett-Packard Company	Pfizer Inc.
The Boeing Company	The Home Depot, Inc.	The Procter & Gamble Company
Caterpillar Inc.	Intel Corporation	United Technologies Corporation
Chevron Corporation	International Business Machines Corporation	Verizon Communications Inc.
Citigroup Inc.	Johnson & Johnson	Wal-Mart Stores, Inc.
The Coca-Cola Company	JPMorgan Chase & Co.	The Walt Disney Company
Dropped from Average
American International Group, Inc. ↓		

== February 19, 2008 ==
3M Company	The Coca-Cola Company	JPMorgan Chase & Co.
Alcoa Inc.	E.I. du Pont de Nemours & Company	McDonald's Corporation
American Express Company	Exxon Mobil Corporation	Merck & Co., Inc.
American International Group, Inc.	General Electric Company	Microsoft Corporation
AT&T Inc.	General Motors Corporation	Pfizer Inc.
Bank of America Corporation ↑	Hewlett-Packard Company	The Procter & Gamble Company
The Boeing Company	The Home Depot, Inc.	United Technologies Corporation
Caterpillar Inc.	Intel Corporation	Verizon Communications Inc.
Chevron Corporation ↑	International Business Machines Corporation	Wal-Mart Stores, Inc.
Citigroup Inc.	Johnson & Johnson	The Walt Disney Company
Dropped from Average
Altria Group, Inc. ↓	Honeywell International Inc.↓	

== November 21, 2005 ==
3M Company	E.I. du Pont de Nemours & Company	JPMorgan Chase & Co.
Alcoa Inc.	Exxon Mobil Corporation	McDonald's Corporation
Altria Group Incorporated	General Electric Company	Merck & Co., Inc.
American Express Company	General Motors Corporation	Microsoft Corporation
American International Group, Inc.	Hewlett-Packard Company	Pfizer Inc.
AT&T Inc. † (formerly SBC Communications Inc.)	The Home Depot, Inc.	The Procter & Gamble Company
The Boeing Company	Honeywell International Inc.	United Technologies Corporation
Caterpillar Inc.	Intel Corporation	Verizon Communications Inc.
Citigroup Inc.	International Business Machines Corporation	Wal-Mart Stores, Inc.
The Coca-Cola Company	Johnson & Johnson	The Walt Disney Company

SBC Communications Inc. was renamed AT&T Inc. after it acquired the original AT&T.

== April 8, 2004 ==
3M Company	Exxon Mobil Corporation	McDonald's Corporation
Alcoa Inc.	General Electric Company	Merck & Co., Inc.
Altria Group Incorporated	General Motors Corporation	Microsoft Corporation
American Express Company	Hewlett-Packard Company	Pfizer Inc. ↑
American International Group, Inc. ↑	The Home Depot, Inc.	The Procter & Gamble Company
The Boeing Company	Honeywell International	SBC Communications Inc.
Caterpillar Inc.	Intel Corporation	United Technologies Corporation
Citigroup Inc.	International Business Machines Corporation	Verizon Communications Inc. ↑
The Coca-Cola Company	Johnson & Johnson	Wal-Mart Stores, Inc.
E.I. du Pont de Nemours & Company	JPMorgan Chase & Co.	The Walt Disney Company
Dropped from Average
AT&T Corporation ↓	Eastman Kodak Company ↓	International Paper Company ↓

== January 27, 2003 ==
3M Company † (formerly Minnesota Mining & Manufacturing Company)	Eastman Kodak Company	Johnson & Johnson
Alcoa Inc.	Exxon Mobil Corporation † (formerly Exxon Corporation)	JPMorgan Chase & Co. † (formerly J.P. Morgan & Co.)
Altria Group, Incorporated † (formerly Philip Morris Companies Inc.)	General Electric Company	McDonald's Corporation
American Express Company	General Motors Corporation	Merck & Co., Inc.
AT&T Corporation	Hewlett-Packard Company	Microsoft Corporation
The Boeing Company	The Home Depot, Inc.	The Procter & Gamble Company
Caterpillar Inc.	Honeywell International † (formerly AlliedSignal Incorporated)	SBC Communications Inc.
Citigroup Inc.	Intel Corporation	United Technologies Corporation
The Coca-Cola Company	International Business Machines Corporation	Wal-Mart Stores, Inc.
E.I. du Pont de Nemours & Company	International Paper Company	The Walt Disney Company

Only name changes occurred. AlliedSignal Incorporated merged with and changed its name to Honeywell International. Exxon Corporation changed its name to Exxon Mobil Corporation upon merging with Mobil, J.P. Morgan & Company changed its name to JPMorgan Chase & Co., Minnesota Mining & Manufacturing changed its name to 3M Company, and Philip Morris Companies Inc. changed its name to Altria Group, Incorporated.

== November 1, 1999 ==
Alcoa Inc. † (formerly Aluminum Company of America)	Exxon Corporation	McDonald's Corporation
AlliedSignal Incorporated	General Electric Company	Merck & Co., Inc.
American Express Company	General Motors Corporation	Microsoft Corporation ↑
AT&T Corporation	Hewlett-Packard Company	Minnesota Mining & Manufacturing Company
The Boeing Company	The Home Depot, Inc. ↑	Philip Morris Companies Inc.
Caterpillar Inc.	Intel Corporation ↑	The Procter & Gamble Company
Citigroup Inc. † (formerly Travelers Inc.)	International Business Machines Corporation	SBC Communications Inc. ↑
The Coca-Cola Company	International Paper Company	United Technologies Corporation
E.I. du Pont de Nemours & Company	Johnson & Johnson	Wal-Mart Stores, Inc.
Eastman Kodak Company	J.P. Morgan & Company	The Walt Disney Company
Dropped from Average
Chevron Corporation ↓	Sears Roebuck & Company ↓	Union Carbide Corporation ↓
Goodyear Tire and Rubber Company ↓		

Travelers and Citicorp merge under the name Citigroup.

== March 17, 1997 ==
AlliedSignal Incorporated	Exxon Corporation	Merck & Co., Inc.
Aluminum Company of America	General Electric Company	Minnesota Mining & Manufacturing Company
American Express Company	General Motors Corporation	Philip Morris Companies Inc.
AT&T Corporation	Goodyear Tire and Rubber Company	The Procter & Gamble Company
The Boeing Company	Hewlett-Packard Company ↑	Sears Roebuck & Company
Caterpillar Inc.	International Business Machines Corporation	Travelers Inc. ↑
Chevron Corporation	International Paper Company	Union Carbide Corporation
The Coca-Cola Company	Johnson & Johnson ↑	United Technologies Corporation
E.I. du Pont de Nemours & Company	J.P. Morgan & Company	Wal-Mart Stores, Inc. ↑
Eastman Kodak Company	McDonald's Corporation	The Walt Disney Company
Dropped from Average
Bethlehem Steel Corporation ↓	Westinghouse Electric Corporation ↓	Venator ↓
Texaco Incorporated ↓		

Bethlehem Steel, Texaco, Westinghouse, and Venator (then known as Woolworth; name changed to Foot Locker in 2001) were replaced by Hewlett-Packard, Johnson & Johnson, Travelers Group, and Wal-Mart Stores.

== May 6, 1991 ==
Allied-Signal Incorporated	Eastman Kodak Company	Minnesota Mining & Manufacturing Company
Aluminum Company of America	Exxon Corporation	Philip Morris Companies Inc.
American Express Company	General Electric Company	The Procter & Gamble Company
AT&T Corporation † (formerly American Telephone and Telegraph Company)	General Motors Corporation	Sears Roebuck & Company
Bethlehem Steel Corporation	Goodyear Tire and Rubber Company	Texaco Incorporated
The Boeing Company	International Business Machines Corporation	Union Carbide Corporation
Caterpillar Inc. ↑	International Paper Company	United Technologies Corporation
Chevron Corporation	J.P. Morgan & Company ↑	The Walt Disney Company ↑
The Coca-Cola Company	McDonald's Corporation	Westinghouse Electric Corporation
E.I. du Pont de Nemours & Company	Merck & Co., Inc.	F. W. Woolworth Company
Dropped from Average
Navistar International Corporation ↓	Primerica↓	USX Corporation ↓

American Telephone and Telegraph Company changed its name to AT&T Corporation.

== March 12, 1987 ==
Allied-Signal Incorporated	Eastman Kodak Company	Navistar International Corporation † (formerly International Harvester Company)
Aluminum Company of America	Exxon Corporation	Philip Morris Companies Inc.
Primerica (formerly American Can Company)	General Electric Company	The Procter & Gamble Company
American Express Company	General Motors Corporation	Sears Roebuck & Company
American Telephone and Telegraph Company	Goodyear Tire and Rubber Company	Texaco Incorporated
Bethlehem Steel Corporation	International Business Machines Corporation	Union Carbide Corporation
The Boeing Company ↑	International Paper Company	United Technologies Corporation
Chevron Corporation	McDonald's Corporation	USX Corporation † (formerly United States Steel Corporation)
The Coca-Cola Company ↑	Merck & Co., Inc.	Westinghouse Electric Corporation
E.I. du Pont de Nemours & Company	Minnesota Mining & Manufacturing Company	F. W. Woolworth Company
Dropped from Average
Inco Limited ↓	Owens-Illinois, Inc. ↓	

American Can Company changed its name to Primerica, International Harvester changed its name to Navistar International Corporation and U.S. Steel changed its name to USX Corporation.

== October 30, 1985 ==
Allied-Signal Incorporated † (formerly Allied Chemical Corporation)	General Electric Company	Owens-Illinois, Inc.
Aluminum Company of America	General Motors Corporation	Philip Morris Companies Inc. ↑
American Can Company	Goodyear Tire and Rubber Company	The Procter & Gamble Company
American Express Company	Inco Limited	Sears Roebuck & Company
American Telephone and Telegraph Company	International Business Machines Corporation	Texaco Incorporated
Bethlehem Steel Corporation	International Harvester Company	Union Carbide Corporation
Chevron Corporation † (formerly Standard Oil Co. of California)	International Paper Company	United States Steel Corporation
E.I. du Pont de Nemours & Company	McDonald's Corporation ↑	United Technologies Corporation
Eastman Kodak Company	Merck & Co., Inc.	Westinghouse Electric Corporation
Exxon Corporation	Minnesota Mining & Manufacturing Company	F. W. Woolworth Company
Dropped from Average
American Tobacco Company (B shares) ↓	General Foods Corporation ↓	

After merging with Signal Corp., Allied Chemical changed its name to Allied-Signal Incorporated and Standard Oil of California changed its name to Chevron Corporation.

== August 30, 1982 ==
Allied Chemical Corporation	General Electric Company	Owens-Illinois, Inc.
Aluminum Company of America	General Foods Corporation	The Procter & Gamble Company
American Can Company	General Motors Corporation	Sears Roebuck & Company
American Express Company ↑	Goodyear Tire and Rubber Company	Standard Oil Co. of California
American Telephone and Telegraph Company	Inco Limited	Texaco Incorporated
American Tobacco Company (B shares)	International Business Machines Corporation	Union Carbide Corporation
Bethlehem Steel Corporation	International Harvester Company	United States Steel Corporation
E.I. du Pont de Nemours & Company	International Paper Company	United Technologies Corporation
Eastman Kodak Company	Merck & Co., Inc.	Westinghouse Electric Corporation
Exxon Corporation	Minnesota Mining & Manufacturing Company	F. W. Woolworth Company
Dropped from Average
Johns-Manville Corporation ↓		

== June 29, 1979 ==
Allied Chemical Corporation	General Foods Corporation	Owens-Illinois, Inc.
Aluminum Company of America	General Motors Corporation	The Procter & Gamble Company
American Can Company	Goodyear Tire and Rubber Company	Sears Roebuck & Company
American Telephone and Telegraph Company	Inco Limited	Standard Oil Co. of California
American Tobacco Company (B shares)	International Business Machines Corporation ↑	Texaco Incorporated
Bethlehem Steel Corporation	International Harvester Company	Union Carbide Corporation
E.I. du Pont de Nemours & Company	International Paper Company	United States Steel Corporation
Eastman Kodak Company	Johns-Manville Corporation	United Technologies Corporation
Exxon Corporation	Merck & Co., Inc. ↑	Westinghouse Electric Corporation
General Electric Company	Minnesota Mining & Manufacturing Company	F. W. Woolworth Company
Dropped from Average
Chrysler Corporation ↓	Esmark Corporation ↓	

== August 9, 1976 ==
Allied Chemical Corporation	Exxon Corporation † (formerly Standard Oil Co. of New Jersey)	Owens-Illinois, Inc.
Aluminum Company of America	General Electric Company	The Procter & Gamble Company
American Can Company	General Foods Corporation	Sears Roebuck & Company
American Telephone and Telegraph Company	General Motors Corporation	Standard Oil Co. of California
American Tobacco Company (B shares)	Goodyear Tire and Rubber Company	Texaco Incorporated
Bethlehem Steel Corporation	Inco Limited † (formerly International Nickel Company, Ltd.)	Union Carbide Corporation
Chrysler Corporation	International Harvester Company	United States Steel Corporation
E.I. du Pont de Nemours & Company	International Paper Company	United Technologies Corporation † (formerly United Aircraft Corporation)
Eastman Kodak Company	Johns-Manville Corporation	Westinghouse Electric Corporation
Esmark Corporation † (formerly Swift & Company)	Minnesota Mining & Manufacturing Company ↑	F. W. Woolworth Company
Dropped from Average
Anaconda Copper Mining Company ↓		

International Nickel changed its name to Inco, Swift & Company changed its name to Esmark, Standard Oil (NJ) changed its name to Exxon Corporation, United Aircraft changed its name to United Technologies Corporation.

== June 1, 1959 ==
Allied Chemical Corporation † (formerly Allied Chemical and Dye Corporation)	General Electric Company	Sears Roebuck & Company
Aluminum Company of America ↑	General Foods Corporation	Standard Oil Co. of California
American Can Company	General Motors Corporation	Standard Oil Co. of New Jersey
American Telephone and Telegraph Company	Goodyear Tire and Rubber Company	Swift & Company ↑
American Tobacco Company (B shares)	International Harvester Company	Texaco Incorporated † (formerly The Texas Company)
Anaconda Copper Mining Company ↑	International Nickel Company, Ltd.	Union Carbide Corporation
Bethlehem Steel Corporation	International Paper Company	United Aircraft Corporation
Chrysler Corporation	Johns-Manville Corporation	United States Steel Corporation
E.I. du Pont de Nemours & Company	Owens-Illinois, Inc. ↑	Westinghouse Electric Corporation
Eastman Kodak Company	The Procter & Gamble Company	F. W. Woolworth Company
Dropped from Average
American Smelting & Refining Company ↓	National Distillers Products Corporation ↓	National Steel Corporation ↓
Corn Products Refining Company ↓		

Texas Company changed its name to Texaco Incorporated. Allied Chemical and Dye Corporation shortened its name to Allied Chemical Corporation.

== July 3, 1956 ==
Allied Chemical and Dye Corporation	General Electric Company	The Procter & Gamble Company
American Can Company	General Foods Corporation	Sears Roebuck & Company
American Smelting & Refining Company	General Motors Corporation	Standard Oil Co. of California
American Telephone and Telegraph Company	Goodyear Tire and Rubber Company	Standard Oil Co. of New Jersey
American Tobacco Company (B shares)	International Harvester Company	The Texas Company
Bethlehem Steel Corporation	International Nickel Company, Ltd.	Union Carbide Corporation
Chrysler Corporation	International Paper Company ↑	United Aircraft Corporation
Corn Products Refining Company	Johns-Manville Corporation	United States Steel Corporation
E.I. du Pont de Nemours & Company	National Distillers Products Corporation	Westinghouse Electric Corporation
Eastman Kodak Company	National Steel Corporation	F. W. Woolworth Company
Dropped from Average
Loew's Theatres Incorporated ↓		

== March 4, 1939 ==
Allied Chemical and Dye Corporation	General Electric Company	The Procter & Gamble Company
American Can Company	General Foods Corporation	Sears Roebuck & Company
American Smelting & Refining Company	General Motors Corporation	Standard Oil Co. of California
American Telephone and Telegraph Company ↑	Goodyear Tire and Rubber Company	Standard Oil Co. of New Jersey
American Tobacco Company (B shares)	International Harvester Company	The Texas Company
Bethlehem Steel Corporation	International Nickel Company, Ltd.	Union Carbide Corporation
Chrysler Corporation	Johns-Manville Corporation	United Aircraft Corporation ↑
Corn Products Refining Company	Loew's Theatres Incorporated	United States Steel Corporation
E.I. du Pont de Nemours & Company	National Distillers Products Corporation	Westinghouse Electric Corporation
Eastman Kodak Company	National Steel Corporation	F. W. Woolworth Company
Dropped from Average
International Business Machines Corporation ↓	Nash Motors Company ↓	

== November 20, 1935 ==
Allied Chemical and Dye Corporation	General Foods Corporation	National Steel Corporation ↑
American Can Company	General Motors Corporation	The Procter & Gamble Company
American Smelting & Refining Company	Goodyear Tire and Rubber Company	Sears Roebuck & Company
American Tobacco Company (B shares)	International Business Machines Corporation	Standard Oil Co. of California
Bethlehem Steel Corporation	International Harvester Company	Standard Oil Co. of New Jersey
Chrysler Corporation	International Nickel Company, Ltd.	The Texas Company
Corn Products Refining Company	Johns-Manville Corporation	Union Carbide Corporation
E.I. du Pont de Nemours & Company ↑	Loew's Theatres Incorporated	United States Steel Corporation
Eastman Kodak Company	Nash Motors Company	Westinghouse Electric Corporation
General Electric Company	National Distillers Products Corporation	F. W. Woolworth Company
Dropped from Average
Borden, Inc. ↓	The Coca-Cola Company ↓	

== August 13, 1934 ==
Allied Chemical and Dye Corporation	General Electric Company	National Distillers Products Corporation ↑
American Can Company	General Foods Corporation	The Procter & Gamble Company
American Smelting & Refining Company	General Motors Corporation	Sears Roebuck & Company
American Tobacco Company (B shares)	Goodyear Tire and Rubber Company	Standard Oil Co. of California
Bethlehem Steel Corporation	International Business Machines Corporation	Standard Oil Co. of New Jersey
Borden, Inc.	International Harvester Company	The Texas Company
Chrysler Corporation	International Nickel Company, Ltd.	Union Carbide Corporation
The Coca-Cola Company	Johns-Manville Corporation	United States Steel Corporation
Corn Products Refining Company	Loew's Theatres Incorporated	Westinghouse Electric Corporation
Eastman Kodak Company	Nash Motors Company	F. W. Woolworth Company
Dropped from Average
United Aircraft and Transport Corporation ↓		

== August 15, 1933 ==
Allied Chemical and Dye Corporation	General Electric Company	The Procter & Gamble Company
American Can Company	General Foods Corporation	Sears Roebuck & Company
American Smelting & Refining Company	General Motors Corporation	Standard Oil Co. of California
American Tobacco Company (B shares)	Goodyear Tire and Rubber Company	Standard Oil Co. of New Jersey
Bethlehem Steel Corporation	International Business Machines Corporation	The Texas Company
Borden, Inc.	International Harvester Company	Union Carbide Corporation
Chrysler Corporation	International Nickel Company, Ltd.	United Aircraft and Transport Corporation ↑
The Coca-Cola Company	Johns-Manville Corporation	United States Steel Corporation
Corn Products Refining Company ↑	Loew's Theatres Incorporated	Westinghouse Electric Corporation
Eastman Kodak Company	Nash Motors Company	F. W. Woolworth Company
Dropped from Average
Drug Incorporated ↓	International Shoe Company ↓	

== May 26, 1932 ==
Allied Chemical and Dye Corporation	General Electric Company	Nash Motors Company ↑
American Can Company	General Foods Corporation	The Procter & Gamble Company ↑
American Smelting & Refining Company	General Motors Corporation	Sears Roebuck & Company
American Tobacco Company (B shares) ↑	Goodyear Tire and Rubber Company	Standard Oil Co. of California
Bethlehem Steel Corporation	International Business Machines Corporation ↑	Standard Oil Co. of New Jersey
Borden, Inc.	International Harvester Company	The Texas Company
Chrysler Corporation	International Nickel Company, Ltd.	Union Carbide Corporation
The Coca-Cola Company ↑	International Shoe Company ↑	United States Steel Corporation
Drug Incorporated ↑	Johns-Manville Corporation	Westinghouse Electric Corporation
Eastman Kodak Company	Loew's Theatres Incorporated ↑	F. W. Woolworth Company
Dropped from Average
Hudson Motor Car Company ↓	National Cash Register Company ↓	Texas Gulf Sulphur Company ↓
Liggett & Myers Tobacco Company ↓	Paramount Publix Corporation ↓	United Aircraft and Transport Corporation ↓
Mack Trucks, Inc. ↓	Radio Corporation of America ↓	

== July 18, 1930 ==
Allied Chemical and Dye Corporation	Goodyear Tire and Rubber Company ↑	Sears Roebuck & Company
American Can Company	Hudson Motor Car Company ↑	Standard Oil Co. of California ↑
American Smelting & Refining Company	International Harvester Company	Standard Oil Co. of New Jersey
Bethlehem Steel Corporation	International Nickel Company, Ltd.	The Texas Company
Borden, Inc. ↑	Johns-Manville Corporation	Texas Gulf Sulphur Company
Chrysler Corporation	Liggett & Myers Tobacco Company ↑	Union Carbide Corporation
Eastman Kodak Company ↑	Mack Trucks, Inc.	United Aircraft and Transport Corporation ↑
General Electric Company	National Cash Register Company	United States Steel Corporation
General Foods Corporation	Paramount Publix Corporation	Westinghouse Electric Corporation
General Motors Corporation	Radio Corporation of America	F. W. Woolworth Company
Dropped from Average
The American Sugar Refining Company ↓	Curtiss-Wright Corporation ↓	B.F. Goodrich Corporation ↓
American Tobacco Company (B shares) ↓	General Railway Signal Company ↓	Nash Motors Company ↓
Atlantic Refining Company ↓		

== January 29, 1930 ==
Allied Chemical and Dye Corporation	General Foods Corporation	Paramount Publix Corporation
American Can Company	General Motors Corporation	Radio Corporation of America
American Smelting & Refining Company	General Railway Signal Company	Sears Roebuck & Company
The American Sugar Refining Company	B.F. Goodrich Corporation	Standard Oil Co. of New Jersey
American Tobacco Company (B shares)	International Harvester Company	The Texas Company
Atlantic Refining Company	International Nickel Company, Ltd.	Texas Gulf Sulphur Company
Bethlehem Steel Corporation	Johns-Manville Corporation ↑	Union Carbide Corporation
Chrysler Corporation	Mack Trucks, Inc.	United States Steel Corporation
Curtiss-Wright Corporation	Nash Motors Company	Westinghouse Electric Corporation
General Electric Company	National Cash Register Company	F. W. Woolworth Company
Dropped from Average
North American Company ↓		

== September 14, 1929 ==
Allied Chemical and Dye Corporation	General Foods Corporation † (formerly Postum Incorporated)	Paramount Publix Corporation
American Can Company	General Motors Corporation	Radio Corporation of America
American Smelting & Refining Company	General Railway Signal Company	Sears Roebuck & Company
The American Sugar Refining Company	B.F. Goodrich Corporation	Standard Oil Co. of New Jersey
American Tobacco Company (B shares)	International Harvester Company	The Texas Company
Atlantic Refining Company	International Nickel Company, Ltd.	Texas Gulf Sulphur Company
Bethlehem Steel Corporation	Mack Trucks, Inc.	Union Carbide Corporation
Chrysler Corporation	Nash Motors Company	United States Steel Corporation
Curtiss-Wright Corporation † (formerly Wright Aeronautical)	National Cash Register Company	Westinghouse Electric Corporation
General Electric Company	North American Company	F. W. Woolworth Company

Wright Aeronautical merged with the Curtiss Aeroplane and Motor Company to become Curtiss-Wright. Postum Inc. changed its name to General Foods.

== January 8, 1929 ==
Allied Chemical and Dye Corporation	General Railway Signal Company	Radio Corporation of America
American Can Company	B.F. Goodrich Corporation	Sears Roebuck & Company
American Smelting & Refining Company	International Harvester Company	Standard Oil Co. of New Jersey
The American Sugar Refining Company	International Nickel Company, Ltd.	The Texas Company
American Tobacco Company (B shares)	Mack Trucks, Inc.	Texas Gulf Sulphur Company
Atlantic Refining Company	Nash Motors Company	Union Carbide Corporation
Bethlehem Steel Corporation	National Cash Register Company ↑	United States Steel Corporation
Chrysler Corporation	North American Company	Westinghouse Electric Corporation
General Electric Company	Paramount Publix Corporation	F. W. Woolworth Company
General Motors Corporation	Postum Incorporated	Wright Aeronautical
Dropped from Average
Victor Talking Machine Company ↓		

== October 1, 1928 ==
Allied Chemical and Dye Corporation	General Railway Signal Company ↑	Sears Roebuck & Company
American Can Company	B.F. Goodrich Corporation ↑	Standard Oil Co. of New Jersey ↑
American Smelting & Refining Company	International Harvester Company	The Texas Company
The American Sugar Refining Company	International Nickel Company, Ltd. ↑	Texas Gulf Sulphur Company ↑
American Tobacco Company (B shares)	Mack Trucks, Inc.	Union Carbide Corporation ↑
Atlantic Refining Company ↑	Nash Motors Company ↑	United States Steel Corporation
Bethlehem Steel Corporation ↑	North American Company ↑	Victor Talking Machine Company ↑
Chrysler Corporation ↑	Paramount Publix Corporation † (formerly Paramount Famous Lasky Corporation)	Westinghouse Electric Corporation ↑
General Electric Company	Postum Incorporated ↑	F. W. Woolworth Company
General Motors Corporation	Radio Corporation of America ↑	Wright Aeronautical ↑
Dropped from Average
American Car and Foundry Company ↓	American Telephone and Telegraph Company ↓	United States Rubber Company ↓
American Locomotive Company ↓	United Drug Stores ↓	Western Union Company ↓

The index was expanded to thirty companies.
American Car and Foundry, American Locomotive, AT&T, United Drug, U.S. Rubber, and Western Union were replaced.
Atlantic Refining, Bethlehem Steel, Chrysler, General Railway Signal, Goodrich, International Nickel, Nash Motors, North American, Postum Incorporated, Radio Corporation of America, Standard Oil (NJ), Texas Gulf Sulphur, Union Carbide, Victor Talking Machine, Westinghouse Electric, and Wright Aeronautical were added.
Paramount Famous Lasky Corporation changed its name to Paramount Publix.

== March 16, 1927 ==
Allied Chemical and Dye Corporation	American Tobacco Company (B shares)	The Texas Company
American Can Company	General Electric Company	United Drug Stores ↑
American Car and Foundry Company	General Motors Corporation	United States Rubber Company
American Locomotive Company	International Harvester Company	United States Steel Corporation
American Smelting & Refining Company	Mack Trucks, Inc.	Western Union Company
The American Sugar Refining Company	Paramount Famous Lasky Corporation	F. W. Woolworth Company
American Telephone and Telegraph Company	Sears Roebuck & Company	
Dropped from Average
Remington Typewriter Company ↓		

== December 31, 1925 ==
Allied Chemical and Dye Corporation	American Tobacco Company (B shares)	Sears Roebuck & Company
American Can Company	General Electric Company	The Texas Company
American Car and Foundry Company	General Motors Corporation	United States Rubber Company
American Locomotive Company	International Harvester Company	United States Steel Corporation
American Smelting & Refining Company	Mack Trucks, Inc. (ex-stock dividend)	Western Union Company
The American Sugar Refining Company	Paramount Famous Lasky Corporation	F. W. Woolworth Company
American Telephone and Telegraph Company	Remington Typewriter Company ↑	
Dropped from Average
Kennecott Mines Company ↓	Mack Trucks (stock dividend) ↓	

== December 7, 1925 ==
Allied Chemical and Dye Corporation ↑	American Tobacco Company (B shares)	Sears Roebuck & Company
American Can Company	General Electric Company	The Texas Company
American Car and Foundry Company	General Motors Corporation	United States Rubber Company
American Locomotive Company	International Harvester Company	United States Steel Corporation
American Smelting & Refining Company	Kennecott Mines Company	Western Union Company
The American Sugar Refining Company	Mack Trucks, Inc. (stock dividend)	F. W. Woolworth Company
American Telephone and Telegraph Company	Paramount Famous Lasky Corporation ↑	
Dropped from Average
United States Realty and Construction Company ↓	Westinghouse Electric Corporation ↓	

== August 31, 1925 ==
American Can Company	General Electric Company	United States Realty and Construction Company ↑
American Car and Foundry Company	General Motors Corporation ↑	United States Rubber Company
American Locomotive Company	International Harvester Company ↑	United States Steel Corporation
American Smelting & Refining Company	Kennecott Mines Company ↑	Western Union Company
The American Sugar Refining Company	Mack Trucks, Inc.	Westinghouse Electric Corporation
American Telephone and Telegraph Company	Sears Roebuck & Company	F. W. Woolworth Company
American Tobacco Company (B shares)	The Texas Company ↑	
Dropped from Average
Anaconda Copper Mining Company ↓	E.I. du Pont de Nemours & Company ↓	Standard Oil Co. (California) ↓
The Baldwin Locomotive Works ↓	Studebaker Corporation ↓	

== May 12, 1924 ==
American Can Company	Anaconda Copper Mining Company	Studebaker Corporation
American Car and Foundry Company	The Baldwin Locomotive Works	United States Rubber Company
American Locomotive Company	E.I. du Pont de Nemours & Company	United States Steel Corporation
American Smelting & Refining Company	General Electric Company	Western Union Company
The American Sugar Refining Company	Mack Trucks, Inc.	Westinghouse Electric
American Telephone and Telegraph Company	Sears Roebuck & Company	F. W. Woolworth Company ↑
American Tobacco Company (B shares)	Standard Oil Co. (California)	
Dropped from Average
Republic Iron and Steel Company ↓		

== February 6, 1924 ==
American Can Company	Anaconda Copper Mining Company	Standard Oil Co. (California) ↑
American Car and Foundry Company	The Baldwin Locomotive Works	Studebaker Corporation
American Locomotive Company	E.I. du Pont de Nemours & Company	United States Rubber Company
American Smelting & Refining Company	General Electric Company	United States Steel Corporation
The American Sugar Refining Company	Mack Trucks, Inc.	Western Union Company
American Telephone and Telegraph Company	Republic Iron and Steel Company	Westinghouse Electric Corporation
American Tobacco Company (B shares)	Sears Roebuck & Company	
Dropped from Average
Utah Copper Company ↓		

== January 22, 1924 ==
American Can Company	Anaconda Copper Mining Company	Studebaker Corporation
American Car and Foundry Company	The Baldwin Locomotive Works	United States Rubber Company
American Locomotive Company	E.I. du Pont de Nemours & Company ↑	United States Steel Corporation
American Smelting & Refining Company	General Electric Company	Utah Copper Company
The American Sugar Refining Company	Mack Trucks, Inc. ↑	Western Union Company
American Telephone and Telegraph Company	Republic Iron and Steel Company	Westinghouse Electric Corporation
American Tobacco Company (B shares) ↑	Sears Roebuck & Company ↑	
Dropped from Average
Central Leather Company ↓	B.F. Goodrich Corporation ↓	The Texas Company ↓
Corn Products Refining Company ↓		

== March 1, 1920 ==
American Can Company	The Baldwin Locomotive Works	The Texas Company
American Car and Foundry Company	Central Leather Company	United States Rubber Company
American Locomotive Company	Corn Products Refining Company ↑	United States Steel Corporation
American Smelting & Refining Company	General Electric Company	Utah Copper Company
The American Sugar Refining Company	B.F. Goodrich Corporation	Western Union Company
American Telephone and Telegraph Company	Republic Iron and Steel Company	Westinghouse Electric Corporation
Anaconda Copper Mining Company	Studebaker Corporation	
Dropped from Average
The American Beet Sugar ↓		

== October 4, 1916 ==
The American Beet Sugar ↑	Anaconda Copper Mining Company	The Texas Company ↑
American Can Company ↑	The Baldwin Locomotive Works ↑	United States Rubber Company
American Car and Foundry Company	Central Leather Company	United States Steel Corporation
American Locomotive Company ↑	General Electric Company	Utah Copper Company ↑
American Smelting & Refining Company	B.F. Goodrich Corporation ↑	Western Union Company ↑
The American Sugar Refining Company	Republic Iron and Steel Company ↑	Westinghouse Electric Corporation ↑
American Telephone and Telegraph Company ↑	Studebaker Corporation ↑	
Dropped from Average
General Motors Corporation ↓	National Lead Company ↓	Peoples Gas Light and Coke Company ↓
United States Steel Corporation (Preferred) ↓		

The index was expanded to twenty companies.
General Motors, National Lead, Peoples Gas and U.S. Steel (Preferred) were removed.
American Beet Sugar, American Can, American Locomotive, AT&T, Baldwin Locomotive, Goodrich, Republic Iron, Studebaker, Texas Company, Utah Copper, Western Union, Westinghouse Electric were added.

== July 29, 1915 ==
American Car and Foundry Company	Central Leather Company	The Peoples Gas Light and Coke Company
American Smelting & Refining Company	General Electric Company	United States Rubber Company
The American Sugar Refining Company	General Motors Corporation	United States Steel Corporation
Anaconda Copper Mining Company (formerly Amalgamated Copper Mining Company)	National Lead Company	United States Steel Corporation (Preferred)
Dropped from Average
Amalgamated Copper Mining Company		

Amalgamated Copper reorganized under the name Anaconda Copper.

== March 16, 1915 ==
Amalgamated Copper Mining Company	Central Leather Company	The Peoples Gas Light and Coke Company
American Car and Foundry Company	General Electric Company	United States Rubber Company
American Smelting & Refining Company	General Motors Corporation ↑	United States Steel Corporation
The American Sugar Refining Company	National Lead Company	United States Steel Corporation (Preferred)
Dropped from Average
United States Rubber Company (First Preferred) ↓		

== May 12, 1912 ==
Amalgamated Copper Mining Company	Central Leather Company ↑	United States Rubber Company
American Car and Foundry Company	General Electric Company	United States Rubber Company (First Preferred)
American Smelting & Refining Company	National Lead Company	United States Steel Corporation
The American Sugar Refining Company	The Peoples Gas Light and Coke Company	United States Steel Corporation (Preferred)
Dropped from Average
Colorado Fuel and Iron Company ↓		

== November 7, 1907 ==
Amalgamated Copper Mining Company	Colorado Fuel and Iron Company	United States Rubber Company
American Car and Foundry Company	General Electric Company ↑	United States Rubber Company (First Preferred)
American Smelting & Refining Company	National Lead Company	United States Steel Corporation
The American Sugar Refining Company	The Peoples Gas Light and Coke Company	United States Steel Corporation (Preferred)
Dropped from Average
Tennessee Coal, Iron and Railroad Company ↓		

== April 1, 1905 ==
Amalgamated Copper Mining Company	Colorado Fuel and Iron Company	United States Rubber Company
American Car and Foundry Company	National Lead Company	United States Rubber Company (First Preferred) ↑
American Smelting & Refining Company	The Peoples Gas Light and Coke Company	United States Steel Corporation
The American Sugar Refining Company	Tennessee Coal, Iron and Railroad Company	United States Steel Corporation (Preferred)
Dropped from Average
The United States Leather Company (Preferred) ↓		

== July 1, 1901 ==
Amalgamated Copper Mining Company	Colorado Fuel and Iron Company ↑	The United States Leather Company (Preferred)
American Car and Foundry Company ↑	National Lead Company	United States Rubber Company
American Smelting & Refining Company	The Peoples Gas Light and Coke Company	United States Steel Corporation
The American Sugar Refining Company	Tennessee Coal, Iron and Railroad Company	United States Steel Corporation (Preferred)
Dropped from Average
Continental Tobacco Company ↓	International Paper Company (Preferred) ↓	

== April 1, 1901 ==
Amalgamated Copper Mining Company ↑	International Paper Company (Preferred) ↑	The United States Leather Company (Preferred)
American Smelting & Refining Company ↑	National Lead Company	United States Rubber Company
The American Sugar Refining Company	The Peoples Gas Light and Coke Company	United States Steel Corporation ↑
Continental Tobacco Company	Tennessee Coal, Iron and Railroad Company	United States Steel Corporation (Preferred) ↑
Dropped from Average
The American Cotton Oil Company ↓	Federal Steel Company ↓	Pacific Mail Steamship Company ↓
American Steel & Wire Co. ↓	General Electric Company ↓	

== April 21, 1899 ==
The American Cotton Oil Company	Federal Steel Company ↑	The Peoples Gas Light and Coke Company
American Steel & Wire Co. ↑	General Electric Company ↑	Tennessee Coal, Iron and Railroad Company
The American Sugar Refining Company	National Lead Company	The United States Leather Company (Preferred)
Continental Tobacco Company ↑	Pacific Mail Steamship Company	United States Rubber Company
Dropped from Average
American Spirits Manufacturing Co. ↓	The Laclede Gas Company ↓	Standard Rope & Twine Co. ↓
American Tobacco Company ↓		

== September 1, 1898 ==
The American Cotton Oil Company	The Laclede Gas Company	Standard Rope & Twine Co.
American Spirits Manufacturing Co.	National Lead Company	Tennessee Coal, Iron and Railroad Company
The American Sugar Refining Company	Pacific Mail Steamship Company	The United States Leather Company (Preferred)
American Tobacco Company	The Peoples Gas Light and Coke Company	United States Rubber Company ↑
Dropped from Average
General Electric Company ↓		

== March 24, 1898 ==
The American Cotton Oil Company	General Electric Company	Peoples Gas
American Spirits Manufacturing Co.	The Laclede Gas Company	Standard Rope & Twine Co.
The American Sugar Refining Company	National Lead Company	Tennessee Coal, Iron and Railroad Company
American Tobacco Company	Pacific Mail Steamship Company	The United States Leather Company (Preferred)

Peoples Gas absorbs Chicago Gas.

== December 23, 1896 ==
The American Cotton Oil Company	Chicago Gas Light and Coke Company	Pacific Mail Steamship Company
American Spirits Manufacturing Co.	General Electric Company	Standard Rope & Twine Co. ↑
The American Sugar Refining Company	The Laclede Gas Company	Tennessee Coal, Iron and Railroad Company
American Tobacco Company	National Lead Company	The United States Leather Company (Preferred)
Dropped from Average
United States Cordage Company (Preferred) ↓		

== November 10, 1896 ==
The American Cotton Oil Company	Chicago Gas Light and Coke Company	Pacific Mail Steamship Company ↑
American Spirits Manufacturing Co.	General Electric Company	Tennessee Coal, Iron and Railroad Company
The American Sugar Refining Company	The Laclede Gas Company	United States Cordage Company (Preferred)
American Tobacco Company	National Lead Company	The United States Leather Company (Preferred)
Dropped from Average
United States Rubber Company ↓		

== August 26, 1896 ==
The American Cotton Oil Company	Chicago Gas Light and Coke Company	Tennessee Coal, Iron and Railroad Company
American Spirits Manufacturing Co. † (formerly Distilling & Cattle Feeding Co.)	General Electric Company	United States Cordage Company (Preferred) ↑
The American Sugar Refining Company	The Laclede Gas Company	The United States Leather Company (Preferred)
American Tobacco Company	National Lead Company	United States Rubber Company
Dropped from Average
North American Company ↓		

Distilling & Cattle Feeding changed its name to American Spirits Manufacturing.

== May 26, 1896 ==
The First Dow Jones Industrial Average

The American Cotton Oil Company ↑	Distilling & Cattle Feeding Co. ↑	North American Company ↑
The American Sugar Refining Company ↑	General Electric Company ↑	Tennessee Coal, Iron and Railroad Company ↑
American Tobacco Company ↑	The Laclede Gas Company ↑	The United States Leather Company (Preferred) ↑
Chicago Gas Light and Coke Company ↑	National Lead Company ↑	United States Rubber Company ↑

Only American Sugar carried over from the precursors.

== Precursors to the DJIA ==
Prior to the May 26, 1896, inception of the Dow Jones Industrial Average, Charles Dow's stock average consisted of the Dow Jones Transportation Average. The average was created on July 3, 1884 by Charles Dow, co-founder of Dow Jones & Company, as part of the Customer's Afternoon Letter. From its inception (until May 26, 1896), the Dow Jones Transportation Average consisted of eleven transportation-related companies: nine railroads and two non-rail companies (Western Union and Pacific Mail).

=== April 9, 1894 ===
The American Sugar Refining Company	Chicago, Rock Island and Pacific Railroad	Missouri Pacific Railroad
Chicago, Burlington and Quincy Railroad	Delaware & Hudson Canal	Northern Pacific Railway (Preferred)
Chicago, Milwaukee and St. Paul Railroad	Delaware, Lackawanna and Western Railroad	Union Pacific Railroad
Chicago and North Western Railway	Louisville and Nashville Railroad	The Western Union Telegraph Company
Dropped from Average
Lake Shore Railway	New York Central Railroad	Pacific Mail Steamship Company

=== January 2, 1886 ===
Chicago, Milwaukee & St. Paul Railroad	Lake Shore Railway	Northern Pacific (Preferred)
Chicago & North Western Railway	Louisville & Nashville Railroad	Pacific Mail Steamship Company
Delaware & Hudson Canal	Missouri Pacific Railroad	Union Pacific Railroad
Delaware, Lackawanna & Western Railroad	New York Central Railroad	The Western Union Telegraph Company
Dropped from Average
Central Pacific Railroad	Central Railroad of New Jersey	

=== February 16, 1885 ===
Central Pacific Railroad	Delaware, Lackawanna & Western Railroad	Northern Pacific Railway (Preferred)
Central Railroad of New Jersey	Lake Shore Railway	Pacific Mail Steamship Company
Chicago, Milwaukee & St. Paul Railroad	Louisville & Nashville Railroad	Union Pacific Railroad
Chicago & North Western Railway	Missouri Pacific Railroad	The Western Union Telegraph Company
Delaware & Hudson Canal	New York Central Railroad	

=== July 3, 1884 ===
Chicago & North Western Railway Company	Missouri Pacific Railroad Company	Chicago, Milwaukee & St. Paul Rail Road Company
Delaware, Lackawanna & Western Railroad Company	New York Central Railroad Company	Union Pacific Railroad Company
Lake Shore Railway Company	Northern Pacific Railway Company (Preferred)	The Western Union Telegraph Company
Louisville & Nashville Railroad Company	Pacific Mail Steamship Company	

== Initial components ==
Charles Dow calculated his first average purely of industrial stocks on May 26, 1896, creating what is now known as the Dow Jones Industrial Average. None of the original 12 industrials still remain part of the index.

- American Cotton Oil Company, a predecessor company to Hellmann's and Best Foods, now part of Unilever.
- American Sugar Refining Company, became Domino Sugar in 1900, now Domino Foods, Inc.
- American Tobacco Company, broken up in a 1911 antitrust action.
- Chicago Gas Company, bought by Peoples Gas Light in 1897, was an operating subsidiary of the now-defunct Integrys Energy Group until 2014.
- Distilling & Cattle Feeding Company, now Millennium Chemicals, formerly a division of LyondellBasell.
- General Electric, still in operation, removed from the Dow Jones Industrial Average in 2018.
- Laclede Gas Company, still in operation as Spire Inc, removed from the Dow Jones Industrial Average in 1899.
- National Lead Company, now NL Industries, removed from the Dow Jones Industrial Average in 1916.
- North American Company, an electric utility holding company, broken up by the U.S. Securities and Exchange Commission (SEC) in 1946.
- Tennessee Coal, Iron and Railroad Company in Birmingham, Alabama, acquired by U.S. Steel in 1907; U.S. Steel was removed from the Dow Jones Industrial Average in 1991.
- United States Leather Company, dissolved in 1952.
- United States Rubber Company, changed its name to Uniroyal in 1961, merged with private Goodrich Corporation in 1986, tire business bought by Michelin in 1990. The remainder of Goodrich remained independent until it was acquired by United Technologies in 2012 and became a part of UTC Aerospace Systems, now Collins Aerospace, a Raytheon Technologies subsidiary.

== See also ==
- List of Dow Jones Industrial Average companies
