= S&P 500 Dividend Aristocrats =

Financial index

The S&P 500 Dividend Aristocrats is a stock market index composed of the companies in the S&P 500 index that have increased their dividends in each of the past 25 consecutive years. It was launched in May 2005.

There are other indices of dividend aristocrats that vary regarding market cap and minimum duration of consecutive yearly dividend increases.

Sector makeup
1. Information Technology (2.90%)
2. Financials (14.0%)
3. Industrials (21.7%)
4. Consumer Discretionary (5.80%)
5. Health Care (10.1%)
6. Consumer Staples (21.7%)
7. Energy (2.90%)
8. Materials (11.6%)
9. Utilities (5.80%)
10. Real Estate (4.30%)

Components are added when they reach the 25-year threshold and are removed when they fail to increase their dividend during a calendar year or are removed from the S&P 500. However, a study found that the stock performance of companies improves after they are removed from the index.

The index has been recommended as an alternative to bonds for investors looking to generate income.

To invest in the index, there are several exchange-traded funds (ETFs), which seek to replicate the performance of the index. One example would be NOBL by ProShares, which is traded in BATS.

== Components ==
There are 69 companies in the index, with communications being the only sector unrepresented.

Ticker symbol	Company	Sector
AOS	A.O. Smith	Industrials
ABT	Abbott Laboratories	Health Care
ABBV	AbbVie	Health Care
AFL	AFLAC	Financials
APD	Air Products & Chemicals	Materials
ALB	Albemarle Corporation	Materials
AMCR	Amcor	Materials
ADM	Archer-Daniels-Midland Co	Consumer Staples
ATO	Atmos Energy Corp	Utilities
ADP	Automatic Data Processing	Information Technology
BDX	Becton Dickinson & Co	Health Care
BRO	Brown & Brown Inc.	Financials
BF.B	Brown–Forman (class B)	Consumer Staples
CAH	Cardinal Health Inc	Health Care
CAT	Caterpillar Inc	Industrials
CHRW	C.H. Robinson	Industrials
CVX	Chevron Corp	Energy
CB	Chubb Limited	Financials
CHD	Church & Dwight	Consumer Staples
CINF	Cincinnati Financial Corp	Financials
CTAS	Cintas Corp	Industrials
CLX	Clorox	Consumer Staples
KO	Coca-Cola Co	Consumer Staples
CL	Colgate-Palmolive	Consumer Staples
ED	Consolidated Edison Inc	Utilities
DOV	Dover Corp	Industrials
ECL	Ecolab Inc	Materials
EMR	Emerson Electric	Industrials
ERIE	Erie Indemnity	Financials
ES	Eversource Energy	Utilities
ESS	Essex Property Trust	Real Estate
EXPD	Expeditors International of Washington	Industrials
XOM	Exxon Mobil Corp	Energy
FDS	FactSet Research Systems	Financials
FAST	Fastenal	Industrials
FRT	Federal Realty Investment Trust	Real Estate
BEN	Franklin Resources Inc	Financials
GD	General Dynamics	Industrials
GPC	Genuine Parts Company	Consumer Discretionary
HRL	Hormel Foods Corp	Consumer Staples
ITW	Illinois Tool Works	Industrials
IBM	IBM	Information Technology
SJM	The J. M. Smucker Company	Consumer Staples
JNJ	Johnson & Johnson	Health Care
KVUE	Kenvue, Inc.	Consumer Staples
KMB	Kimberly-Clark	Consumer Staples
LIN	Linde plc	Materials
LOW	Lowe's	Consumer Discretionary
MKC	McCormick & Company	Consumer Staples
MCD	McDonald's Corp	Consumer Discretionary
MDT	Medtronic plc	Health Care
NEE	NextEra Energy	Utilities
NDSN	Nordson Corp	Industrials
NUE	Nucor Corp	Materials
PNR	Pentair	Industrials
PEP	PepsiCo	Consumer Staples
PPG	PPG Industries	Materials
PG	Procter & Gamble	Consumer Staples
O	Realty Income	Real Estate
ROP	Roper Technologies	Industrials
SPGI	S&P Global Inc	Financials
SHW	Sherwin-Williams	Materials
SWK	Stanley Black & Decker	Industrials
SYY	Sysco Corp	Consumer Staples
TROW	T Rowe Price Group Inc	Financials
TGT	Target Corp	Consumer Discretionary
GWW	W. W. Grainger	Industrials
WMT	Walmart Inc.	Consumer Staples
WST	West Pharmaceutical Services	Health Care

=== Components history ===
In 2008, the index contained 52 companies.

The following are the changes to the components of the index since 2008:

Changes to the components of S&P 500 Dividend Aristocrats
Year	Added	Removed	Reference(s)
2025	Erie Indemnity (ERIE), Eversource Energy (ES), Royal Gold (RGLD) and FactSet Research Systems (FDS)	none	
2024	Fastenal Co. (FAST)	Walgreens Boots Alliance Inc. (WBA) and the 3M Company (MMM) - after spinning off Solventum	
2023	CH Robinson Worldwide (CHRW), Nordson (NDSN), J.M. Smucker (SJM) and Kenvue (KVUE).	VF Corporation (VFC)	
2022	Brown & Brown, Inc. (BRO) and Church & Dwight Co., Inc. (CHD).	AT&T Inc. (T); People's United Financial, Inc. (PBCT) (after its merger with M&T Bank Corporation was finalized.)	
2021	IBM (IBM), NextEra Energy (NEE) and West Pharmaceutical Services (WST)	Raytheon (RTX), Carrier Global (CARR), Otis Worldwide (OTIS), Stryker Corporation (SYK) and Leggett & Platt (LEG) (removed when it moved from the S&P 500 to the S&P MidCap 400)	
2020	Amcor (AMCR), Atmos Energy (ATO), Realty Income Corporation (O), Essex Property Trust (ESS), Ross Stores (ROST), Albemarle Corporation (ALB), and Expeditors International (EXPD) (prior to market open on February 3); Carrier Global (CARR) and Otis Worldwide (OTIS) (prior to the market open on April 3)	Ross Stores (ROST) and Helmerich & Payne (HP).	
2019	Chubb Limited (CB), People's United Financial (PBCT), Caterpillar Inc. (CAT), United Technologies (UTX)	none	
2018	none	none	
2017	none	none	
2016	none	Chubb Corp (CB) (upon acquisition by ACE Limited (ACE))	
2015	none	Family Dollar Stores (FDO) (after purchase by Dollar Tree), Sigma-Aldrich (SIAL) (after acquisition by Merck Group)	
2014	none	Bemis (BMS) (after removal from the S&P 500 index)	
2013	none	Pitney Bowes (PBI)	
2012	AT&T (T), Colgate-Palmolive (CL), Franklin Templeton Investments (BEN), Genuine Parts Company (GPC), Health Care Property Investors (HCP), Illinois Tool Works (ITW), Medtronic (MDT), Sysco (SYY), and T. Rowe Price (TROW).	CenturyLink (CTL)	
2011	Ecolab (ECL), Hormel Foods (HRL), and McCormick & Company (MKC)	none	
2010	Brown Forman (BF.B)	Avery Dennison (AVY), BB&T (BBT), Gannett (GCI), General Electric (GE), Johnson Controls (JCI), Legg Mason (LM), M&T Bank (MTB), Pfizer (PFE), State Street Bank (STT), and U.S. Bancorp (USB)	
2009	Bemis Company (BMS) and Leggett & Platt (LEG).	Anheuser Busch (BUD) (acquired by InBev), Bank of America (BAC), Comerica (CMA), Fifth Third Bank (FITB), Keycorp (KEY), Progressive Corp (PGR), Regions Financial (RF), Synovus Financial (SNV), and Wrigley Company (WW) (which was acquired by Mars, Incorporated)	
