= List of Dow Jones Industrial Average companies =

List of companies in the Dow Jones Industrial Average

The Dow Jones Industrial Average (DJIA) is a stock market index tracking the stock performance of 30 large companies listed on stock exchanges in the United States. The index is a price-weighted index; stocks with the highest price per share have the highest weighting in the index. An updated weighting of each component is available online.

== Components ==
The following are the components of the index; Honeywell's ISIN changed on June 29, 2026, with its reverse stock split:

| Company | Exchange | Symbol | ISIN | Sector | Date added | Notes |
|---|---|---|---|---|---|---|
| 3M | NYSE | MMM | US88579Y1010 | Industrials | 1976-08-09 | As Minnesota Mining and Manufacturing |
| Alphabet (Class A) | NASDAQ | GOOGL | US02079K3059 | Communication Services | 2026-06-29 | |
| American Express | NYSE | AXP | US0258161092 | Financials | 1982-08-30 | |
| Amgen | NASDAQ | AMGN | US0311621009 | Health Care | 2020-08-31 | |
| Amazon | NASDAQ | AMZN | US0231351067 | Consumer Discretionary | 2024-02-26 | |
| Apple | NASDAQ | AAPL | US0378331005 | Information Technology | 2015-03-19 | |
| Boeing | NYSE | BA | US0970231058 | Industrials | 1987-03-12 | |
| Caterpillar | NYSE | CAT | US1491231015 | Industrials | 1991-05-06 | |
| Chevron | NYSE | CVX | US1667641005 | Energy | 2008-02-19 | Also 1930-07-18 to 1999-11-01 |
| Cisco | NASDAQ | CSCO | US17275R1023 | Information Technology | 2009-06-08 | |
| Coca-Cola | NYSE | KO | US1912161007 | Consumer Staples | 1987-03-12 | Also 1932-05-26 to 1935-11-20 |
| Disney | NYSE | DIS | US2546871060 | Communication Services | 1991-05-06 | |
| Goldman Sachs | NYSE | GS | US38141G1040 | Financials | 2013-09-23 | |
| Home Depot | NYSE | HD | US4370761029 | Consumer Discretionary | 1999-11-01 | |
| Honeywell Technologies | NASDAQ | HON | US4385162056 | Industrials | 2020-08-31 | Also 1925-12-07 to 2008-02-19 under various names, including Allied Chemical and Dye, Allied Chemical, AlliedSignal and Honeywell |
| IBM | NYSE | IBM | US4592001014 | Information Technology | 1979-06-29 | Also 1932-05-26 to 1939-03-04 |
| Johnson & Johnson | NYSE | JNJ | US4781601046 | Health Care | 1997-03-17 | |
| JPMorgan Chase | NYSE | JPM | US46625H1005 | Financials | 1991-05-06 | |
| McDonald's | NYSE | MCD | US5801351017 | Consumer Discretionary | 1985-10-30 | |
| Merck | NYSE | MRK | US58933Y1055 | Health Care | 1979-06-29 | |
| Microsoft | NASDAQ | MSFT | US5949181045 | Information Technology | 1999-11-01 | |
| Nike | NYSE | NKE | US6541061031 | Consumer Discretionary | 2013-09-23 | |
| Nvidia | NASDAQ | NVDA | US67066G1040 | Information Technology | 2024-11-08 | |
| Procter & Gamble | NYSE | PG | US7427181091 | Consumer Staples | 1932-05-26 | |
| Salesforce | NYSE | CRM | US79466L3024 | Information Technology | 2020-08-31 | |
| Sherwin-Williams | NYSE | SHW | US8243481061 | Materials | 2024-11-08 | |
| Travelers | NYSE | TRV | US89417E1091 | Financials | 2009-06-08 | |
| UnitedHealth Group | NYSE | UNH | US91324P1021 | Health Care | 2012-09-24 | |
| Visa | NYSE | V | US92826C8394 | Financials | 2013-09-23 | |
| Walmart | NASDAQ | WMT | US9311421039 | Consumer Staples | 1997-03-17 | |

== See also ==
- Closing milestones of the Dow Jones Industrial Average
- Historical components of the Dow Jones Industrial Average
- List of largest daily changes in the Dow Jones Industrial Average
