= Dividend aristocrat =

Term referring to a company

A dividend aristocrat commonly refers to a company that is a member of the S&P 500 index and has increased its dividend for at least twenty-five consecutive years. This core definition is consistent with that of the S&P 500 Dividend Aristocrats. However, there are also different definitions. For example, the S&P MidCap 400 Dividend Aristocrats Index is composed of companies in the S&P MidCap 400 that have increased dividends for fifteen consecutive years.

== History ==
The first dividend aristocrat list was published in 1989, with twenty-six companies listed. The continuous increase in the dividend over twenty-five years is a quality feature, especially for long-term oriented investors. Such consistent, long-term dividends also align with dividend investing strategies.

=== Dividend Heroes ===
In some cases, such as City of London Investment Trust, Caledonia Investments, Bankers Investment Trust and Alliance Trust, the dividend has been increased for 57 years.

== See also ==
- Dividend yield
- S&P 500 Dividend Aristocrats
- S&P Europe 350 Dividend Aristocrats
