= High-yield stock =

Stock offering above-average dividend yield

A high-yield stock is a stock whose dividend yield is higher than the yield of any benchmark average such as the ten-year US Treasury note. The classification of a high-yield stock is relative to the criteria of any given analyst. Some analysts may consider a 2% dividend yield to be high, whilst others may consider 2% to be low. There is no set standard for judging whether a dividend yield is high or low. Many analysts do however use indicators such as the previously mentioned comparison between the stock's dividend yield and the 10-Year US Treasury Note.

== Indices ==
Several stock indexes are based on high-yield stocks, such as Dow Jones U.S. Select Dividend Index and FTSE High Dividend Yield Index. S&P High Yield Dividend Aristocrats Index contains companies that have raised their dividends. Equity securities of companies in the utilities industry typically pay relatively high dividends.

== Concept ==
A high dividend yield indicates undervaluation of the stock because the stock's dividend is high relative to the stock price. High dividend yields are a particularly sought after by income and value investors. High-yield stocks tend to outperform low yield and no yield stocks during bear markets because many investors consider dividend paying stocks to be less risky.

== Dividend Aristocrats ==
Dividend aristocrats are known for decades of consecutive years of dividend increases, this does not necessarily mean they have high dividend yields. In fact, the average yield for the dividend aristocrats ETF is between 1.8% and 2.4%. Nonetheless, picking stocks from the top yielding dividend aristocrats is a method for boosting portfolio yields, with the average high yield aristocrat offering investors about a 4% return, with the safety of decades of dividend increases backing up each stock.

== Dogs of the Dow ==
The Dogs of the Dow strategy is a well-known simple strategy which incorporates high dividend yields. The strategy dictates that the investor compile a list of the 10 highest dividend yielding stocks from the Dow Jones Industrial Average and buying an equal position in all 10 at the beginning of each year. At the end of each year, the investor finds the 10 highest dividend yield stocks again, and reallocates their positions so as to have an equal position in all 10 Dogs of the Dow. The Dogs of the Dow made a compounded annual return of 18% from 1975 to 1999 outperforming the market by 3%. This would make $10,000 turn into $625,000 in 25 years.

== The Dow 5 ==
The Dow 5 strategy is a variation of the Dogs of the Dow strategy. This strategy dictates the investor compile a list of the 10 highest dividend yielding stocks from the Dow Jones Industrial Average, and buy the 5 lowest priced of those 10 stocks at the beginning of each year. At the end of every year, the investor remakes the list, and reallocates their positions so as to have an equal position in all 5 stocks. This strategy has made an annual return of 19.4% from 1975 to 1999. This would make $10,000 turn into $840,000 in 25 years.

== Foolish Four ==
The Foolish Four strategy was a strategy popularized on the investing website The Motley Fool. The Foolish Four was almost certainly a result of data dredging. From the time of its discovery onward, it has been famously unreliable in its returns, and even its original creators have since disowned it.
