= Dogs of the Dow =

Stock investment strategy based on Dow Jones Industrial index

The Dogs of the Dow is an investment strategy popularized by Michael B. O'Higgins in a 1991 book and his Dogs of the Dow website. It is a form of dividend investing.

The strategy proposes that an investor annually select for investment the ten stocks listed on the Dow Jones Industrial Average whose dividend is the highest fraction of their price, i.e. stocks with the highest dividend yield. Under other analysis these stocks could be considered "dogs", or undesirable, as companies often raise their dividend in response to bad news or a decline in share price. But the Dogs of the Dow strategy proposes these same stocks have the potential for substantial increases in stock price plus relatively high dividend payouts.

Independent research has produced conflicting results. Some studies find mixed or negative results for the method, but application of the method to international markets confirmed the Dogs of the Dow method may offer superior long-term results.

== History ==
Though popularized in the 1990s by O'Higgins, the "Dogs of the Dow" or "Dow 10" theory has an older history.

An article by H. G. Schneider was published in The Journal of Finance in 1951, based on selecting stocks by their price–earnings ratio.

The method was discussed in The Wall Street Journal in the early 1980s.

== Concept ==
Proponents of the Dogs of the Dow strategy argue that the blue-chip companies that make up the Dow Jones Industrial Average are better able to withstand market and economic downturns and maintain their high dividend yield due to their access to factors such as their established business and brands, access to credit markets, ability to hire top-level management, ability to acquire dynamic companies, etc. Since a high yield often occurs after a significant stock price decline, a high dividend relative to stock price for a blue-chip company tends to suggest that the stock may be a reasonable value with the potential for the stock price to rebound in conjunction with a high dividend payout. However, it's worth noting that dividends are voluntary payments from companies and are never guaranteed.

One reason the Dogs of the Dow strategy is attractive is because it requires minimal effort. By analyzing the dividend yields of stocks contained within the Dow, those stocks that are potentially undervalued are readily apparent because, all else being equal, as the stock price declines, the dividend yield increases because the dividend payout represents a larger portion of the stock price. The dividend yield is calculated by dividing the annual dividend by the current stock price.

Under this model, the investor buys an equal dollar amount of the ten companies. The investor re-invests all dividends or capital gains, and long-term may obtain superior results. The data from Dogs of the Dow suggests that this has been the case since the turn of the century. The logic behind this is that a high-dividend yield suggests both that the stock is oversold (or under-valued) and that management believes in its company's prospects and is willing to back that up by paying out a relatively high dividend. Investors are thereby hoping to benefit from both above-average stock-price gains as well as a relatively high quarterly dividend that can be re-invested to buy additional shares.

Due to the nature of the concept and limited number of stocks involved, the Dogs of the Dow will likely not cover all market sectors. For example, the ten stocks that belonged to the 2019 Dogs of the Dow list came from only seven sectors, including technology, energy, and healthcare, in contrast to the S&P 500 Index which covers eleven sectors.

== Results ==
O'Higgins and others back-tested the strategy as far back as the 1920s and found that investing in the Dogs consistently outperformed the market as a whole. Since that time, the data shows that the Dogs of the Dow as well as the popular variant, the Small Dogs of the Dow, have performed well.

For example, for the twenty years from 1992 to 2011, the Dogs of the Dow on average matched the average annual total return of the DJIA (10.8 percent) and outperformed the S&P 500 (9.6 percent).

The Small Dogs of the Dow, which are the five lowest-priced Dogs of the Dow, outperformed both the Dow and S&P 500 with an average annual total return of 12.6 percent.

When each individual year is reviewed, it is clear that both the Dogs of the Dow and Small Dogs of the Dow did not consistently perform well on a yearly basis. In fact, the Dogs of the Dow and Small Dogs of the Dow struggled to keep up with the Dow during latter stages of the dot-com boom (1998 and 1999) as well as during the 2008 financial crisis. This suggests that an investor would be best served by viewing this as a longer-term strategy by giving this portfolio of stocks time to recover in case of a rare-but-extreme economic event (e.g., dot-com bubble, 2008 financial crisis).

== Analysis ==
A 1998 study found the Dogs of the Dow exploited the "market overreaction hypothesis", taking advantage of investor psychology and the tendency to overreact to negative news. However, the study also noted that the Dow stocks with high-dividend yield were not necessarily the worst performers any given year, which might undermine the strategy's performance occasionally.

Professor Burton Malkiel discusses the Dogs of the Dow in the 1999 version of his book A Random Walk Down Wall Street. He describes the Dogs method as a combination of value investing and contrarian investing, and agrees it has a strong long-term track record but notes it can underperform for several years at a time. Malkiel questions if the method can truly contradict the random walk hypothesis and efficient market hypothesis after transaction costs.

Professor Jeremy Siegel has endorsed the Dogs of the Dow, describing it in The Future for Investors (2005) as “one of the most successful investing strategies of all time." The Dogs method can be particularly effective in bear markets, according to Siegel, as “dividends cushioned the declines in the market”.

The Dogs of the Dow method has been studied internationally and adapted to many foreign markets. Research shows over long-periods, the Dogs method tends to result in superior risk-adjusted performance relative to market averages. However, the method may also result in more volatility and short-term underperformance. Studies have analyzed the method in Finland; Japan; China, and six small nations in Southeast Asia.

On January 8, 2014, asset manager John S. Tobey wrote an article in Forbes magazine where he criticized the Dogs method. Tobey proposed the equal-weighting method for the Dogs made it difficult or impossible to accurately compare to the Dow Jones Industrial Average, DJIA, which uses a different method of price-weighting the stocks. He said that, for the year 2013, using the price weighting the Dogs would have returned less, rather than more, than the DJIA. He suggested that the Dogs strategy is too simple and it neglects factors such as dividend–payout ratio (i.e., how much of the company's profits are devoted to dividends), growth of cash and earnings, and price performance. However, he did not offer advice on how to integrate these factors into the Dogs method. He also criticized the Dogs strategy for back-testing, which can be susceptible to data mining or other shortcomings. He also predicted that the strategy would not work well for 2014.

A 2019 study found the Dogs of the Dow had been disappointing in the few previous years, after taxes and transaction costs, and also suggested holding the 30 Dow stocks equally-weighted will be superior to both the DJIA and the Dogs of the Dow.

== See also ==
- S&P Dow Jones Indexes
- Foolish Four

== Bibliography ==
- O'Higgins, Michael; Downes, John (2000, revised and updated). Beating the Dow – A High-Return, Low-Risk Method for Investing in the Dow Jones Industrial Stocks with as Little as $5,000. HarperBusiness. ISBN 978-0066620473.
