= Dow Jones Industrial Average =

American stock market index composed of 30 industry leaders

- Historical logarithmic graph of the DJIA from 1896 to 2018
- Foundation: February 16, 1885; 141 years ago (as DJA); May 26, 1896 (as DJIA)
- Operator: S&P Dow Jones Indices
- Exchanges: New York Stock Exchange; Nasdaq
- Trading symbol: ^DJI; $INDU; .DJI; DJIA
- Constituents: 30
- Type: Large cap
- Market cap: US$26 trillion (as of July 31, 2026)
- Weighting method: Price-weighted index
- Website: www.spglobal.com/spdji/en/indices/equity/dow-jones-industrial-average/#overview

Industry classification of the components of the index per the Global Industry Classification Standard as of July 31, 2026
1. Financials (27.7%)
2. Information Technology (17.0%)
3. Industrials (16.4%)
4. Health Care (13.4%)
5. Consumer Discretionary (10.4%)
6. Communication Services (5.10%)
7. Materials (3.90%)
8. Consumer Staples (3.90%)
9. Energy (2.20%)

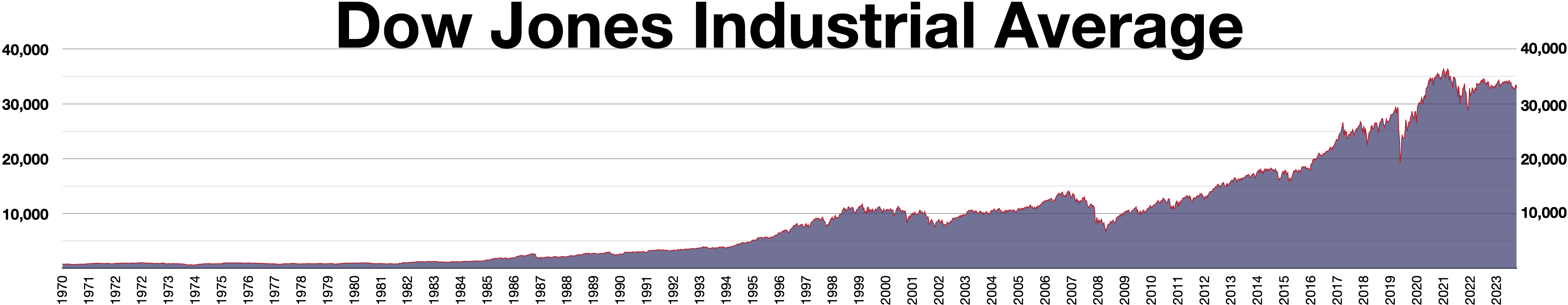
Dow Jones Industrial Average (1970–2022)

The Dow Jones Industrial Average (DJIA), Dow Jones, or simply the Dow (/ˈdaʊ/), is a stock market index tracking the stock performance of 30 large companies listed on stock exchanges in the United States. It is named after founder Charles Dow and his business associate, statistician Edward Jones. It is maintained by S&P Dow Jones Indices and its components are selected by a committee.

The index is a price-weighted index; stocks with the highest price per share have the highest weighting in the index. The value of the index is the sum of the stock prices of the companies included in the index, divided by a factor, which is approximately 0.168 as of July 2026. The factor is changed whenever a constituent company undergoes a stock split so that the value of the index is unaffected by the stock split.

Because the DJIA only includes 30 components, many of which are highly correlated during periods of decline, and the fact that the components with the highest price per share have an undue weighting (Goldman Sachs has the highest weighting in the index and the index performed extremely poorly during the 2008 financial crisis due to the drop of then-component AIG), the DJIA is not considered representative of the U.S. economy and products tracking the index are not recommended as long-term investments by most financial advisors. However, in the long run, the index has performed in line with the broader S&P 500.

Products linked to the DJIA include index funds (exchange-traded funds/ETFs and mutual funds) as well as derivatives (options and futures contracts), which are available for trading in many countries with the goal of replicating the performance of the index. Also available are modified index funds; they replicate the performance of the index with modifications such as the use of covered call strategies, equal weighting, performance buffers, leverage, inclusion of only growth or value stocks, or exclusion of certain sectors, all with the goal of changing the risk/return and yield.

The ten components with the largest dividend yields are referred to as the Dogs of the Dow.

== History ==
In 1884, Charles Dow created his first stock average featuring 11 stocks, mostly railroads, which later became the Dow Jones Transportation Average. It was published in his newsletter, Customer's Afternoon Letter, a daily two-page financial news bulletin which was the precursor to The Wall Street Journal. On February 16, 1885, the Dow Jones Average (DJA) launched as a 14-stock index. On January 2, 1886, the number of stocks represented in what is now the Dow Jones Transportation Average dropped from 14 to 12, as the Central Pacific Railroad and Central Railroad of New Jersey were removed. On May 26, 1896, the Dow Jones Industrial Average debuted with 12 industrial stocks at a starting value of 40.94. The index's 12 original companies were:

- American Cotton Oil Company
- American Sugar Company
- American Tobacco Company
- Chicago Gas Company
- Distilling & Cattle Feeding Company
- General Electric
- Laclede Gas Company
- National Lead Company
- North American Utility Company
- Tennessee Coal & Iron
- U.S. Leather Company (preferred)
- U.S. Rubber Company

== Annual returns ==
The following table shows the annual returns of the DJIA since 1896:

Year	Closing value	Net change	Percentage change
1896	40.45	−0.49	−1.20
1897	49.41	+8.96	+22.15
1898	60.52	+11.11	+22.49
1899	66.08	+5.56	+9.19
1900	70.71	+4.63	+7.01
1901	64.56	−6.15	−8.70
1902	64.29	−0.27	−0.42
1903	49.11	−15.18	−23.61
1904	69.61	+20.50	+41.74
1905	96.20	+26.59	+38.20
1906	94.35	−1.85	−1.92
1907	58.75	−35.60	−37.73
1908	86.15	+27.40	+46.64
1909	99.05	+12.90	+14.97
1910	81.36	−17.69	−17.86
1911	81.68	+0.32	+0.39
1912	87.87	+6.19	+7.58
1913	78.78	−9.09	−10.34
1914	54.58	−24.20	−30.72
1915	99.15	+44.57	+81.66
1916	95.00	−4.15	−4.19
1917	74.38	−20.62	−21.71
1918	82.20	+7.82	+10.51
1919	107.23	+25.03	+30.45
1920	71.95	−35.28	−32.90
1921	81.10	+9.15	+12.72
1922	98.73	+17.63	+21.74
1923	95.52	−3.21	−3.25
1924	120.51	+24.99	+26.16
1925	156.66	+36.15	+30.00
1926	157.20	+0.54	+0.34
1927	202.40	+45.20	+28.75
1928	300.00	+97.60	+48.22
1929	248.48	−51.52	−17.17
1930	164.58	−83.90	−33.77
1931	77.90	−86.68	−52.67
1932	59.93	−17.97	−23.07
1933	99.90	+39.97	+66.69
1934	104.04	+4.14	+4.14
1935	144.13	+40.09	+38.53
1936	179.90	+35.77	+24.82
1937	120.85	−59.05	−32.82
1938	154.76	+33.91	+28.06
1939	150.24	−4.52	−2.92
1940	131.13	−19.11	−12.72
1941	110.96	−20.17	−15.38
1942	119.40	+8.44	+7.61
1943	135.89	+16.49	+13.81
1944	152.32	+16.43	+12.09
1945	192.91	+40.59	+26.65
1946	177.20	−15.71	−8.14
1947	181.16	+3.96	+2.23
1948	177.30	−3.86	−2.13
1949	200.13	+22.83	+12.88
1950	235.41	+35.28	+17.63
1951	269.23	+33.82	+14.37
1952	291.90	+22.67	+8.42
1953	280.90	−11.00	−3.77
1954	404.39	+123.49	+43.96
1955	488.40	+84.01	+20.77
1956	499.47	+11.07	+2.27
1957	435.69	−63.78	−12.77
1958	583.65	+147.96	+33.96
1959	679.36	+95.71	+16.40
1960	615.89	−63.47	−9.34
1961	731.14	+115.25	+18.71
1962	652.10	−79.04	−10.81
1963	762.95	+110.85	+17.00
1964	874.13	+111.18	+14.57
1965	969.26	+95.13	+10.88
1966	785.69	−183.57	−18.94
1967	905.11	+119.42	+15.20
1968	943.75	+38.64	+4.27
1969	800.36	−143.39	−15.19
1970	838.92	+38.56	+4.82
1971	890.20	+51.28	+6.11
1972	1,020.02	+129.82	+14.58
1973	850.86	−169.16	−16.58
1974	616.24	−234.62	−27.57
1975	852.41	+236.17	+38.32
1976	1,004.65	+152.24	+17.86
1977	831.17	−173.48	−17.27
1978	805.01	−26.16	−3.15
1979	838.74	+33.73	+4.19
1980	963.99	+125.25	+14.93
1981	875.00	−88.99	−9.23
1982	1,046.54	+171.54	+19.60
1983	1,258.64	+212.10	+20.27
1984	1,211.57	−47.07	−3.74
1985	1,546.67	+335.10	+27.66
1986	1,895.95	+349.28	+22.58
1987	1,938.83	+42.88	+2.26
1988	2,168.57	+229.74	+11.85
1989	2,753.20	+584.63	+26.96
1990	2,633.66	−119.54	−4.34
1991	3,168.83	+535.17	+20.32
1992	3,301.11	+132.28	+4.17
1993	3,754.09	+452.98	+13.72
1994	3,834.44	+80.35	+2.14
1995	5,117.12	+1,282.68	+33.45
1996	6,448.26	+1,331.14	+26.01
1997	7,908.24	+1,459.98	+22.64
1998	9,181.43	+1,273.19	+16.10
1999	11,497.12	+2,315.69	+25.22
2000	10,786.85	−710.27	−6.18
2001	10,021.50	−765.35	−7.10
2002	8,341.63	−1,679.87	−16.76
2003	10,453.92	+2,112.29	+25.32
2004	10,783.01	+329.09	+3.15
2005	10,717.50	−65.51	−0.61
2006	12,463.15	+1,745.65	+16.29
2007	13,264.82	+801.67	+6.43
2008	8,776.39	−4,488.43	−33.84
2009	10,428.05	+1,651.66	+18.82
2010	11,577.51	+1,149.46	+11.02
2011	12,217.56	+640.05	+5.53
2012	13,104.14	+886.58	+7.26
2013	16,576.66	+3,472.52	+26.50
2014	17,823.07	+1,246.41	+7.52
2015	17,425.03	−398.04	−2.23
2016	19,762.60	+2,337.57	+13.42
2017	24,719.22	+4,956.62	+25.08
2018	23,327.46	−1,391.76	−5.63
2019	28,538.44	+5,210.98	+22.34
2020	30,606.48	+2,068.04	+7.25
2021	36,338.30	+5,731.82	+18.73
2022	33,147.25	−3,191.05	−8.78
2023	37,689.54	+4,542.29	+13.70
2024	42,544.22	+4,854.68	+12.88
2025	48,063.29	+5,519.07	+12.97

== Computation ==
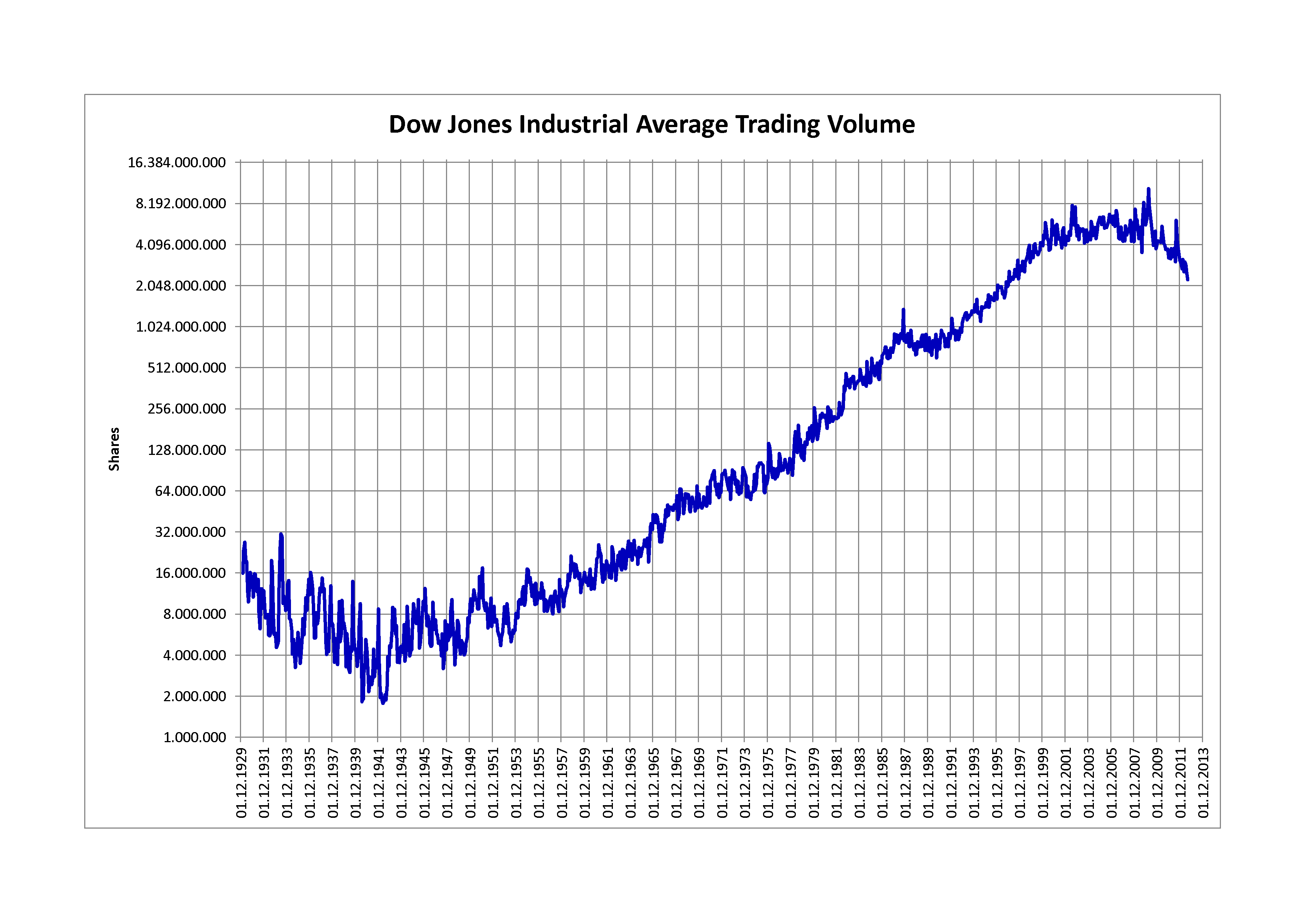
DJIA monthly trading volume in shares from 1929 to 2012

The DJIA is computed as the sum of the prices of all thirty stocks divided by a divisor, the Dow Divisor. The divisor is adjusted in case of stock splits, spinoffs or similar structural changes, to ensure that such events do not in themselves alter the numerical value of the DJIA. Early on, the initial divisor was composed of the original number of component companies; this initially made the DJIA a simple arithmetic average. The present divisor, after many adjustments, is less than one, making the index larger than the sum of the prices of the components. That is:
$$\text{DJIA} = {\sum p \over d}$$
where p are the prices of the component stocks and d is the Dow Divisor.

Events such as stock splits or changes in the list of the companies composing the index alter the sum of the component prices. In these cases, in order to avoid discontinuity in the index, the Dow Divisor is updated so that the quotations right before and after the event coincide:

$$\text{DJIA} = {\sum p_\text{old} \over d_\text{old} } = {\sum p_\text{new} \over d_\text{new} }.$$

Since June 29, 2026, the Dow Divisor is 0.16824816528350 and every $1 change in price in a particular stock within the average equates to a 5.943601 (or 1 ÷ 0.16824816528350) point movement.

== See also ==
- List of Dow Jones Industrial Average companies
- Historical components of the Dow Jones Industrial Average
- Closing milestones of the Dow Jones Industrial Average
- List of largest daily changes in the Dow Jones Industrial Average
- William Peter Hamilton – Fourth editor of The Wall Street Journal, stock-market analyst
